= Observance of Christmas by country =

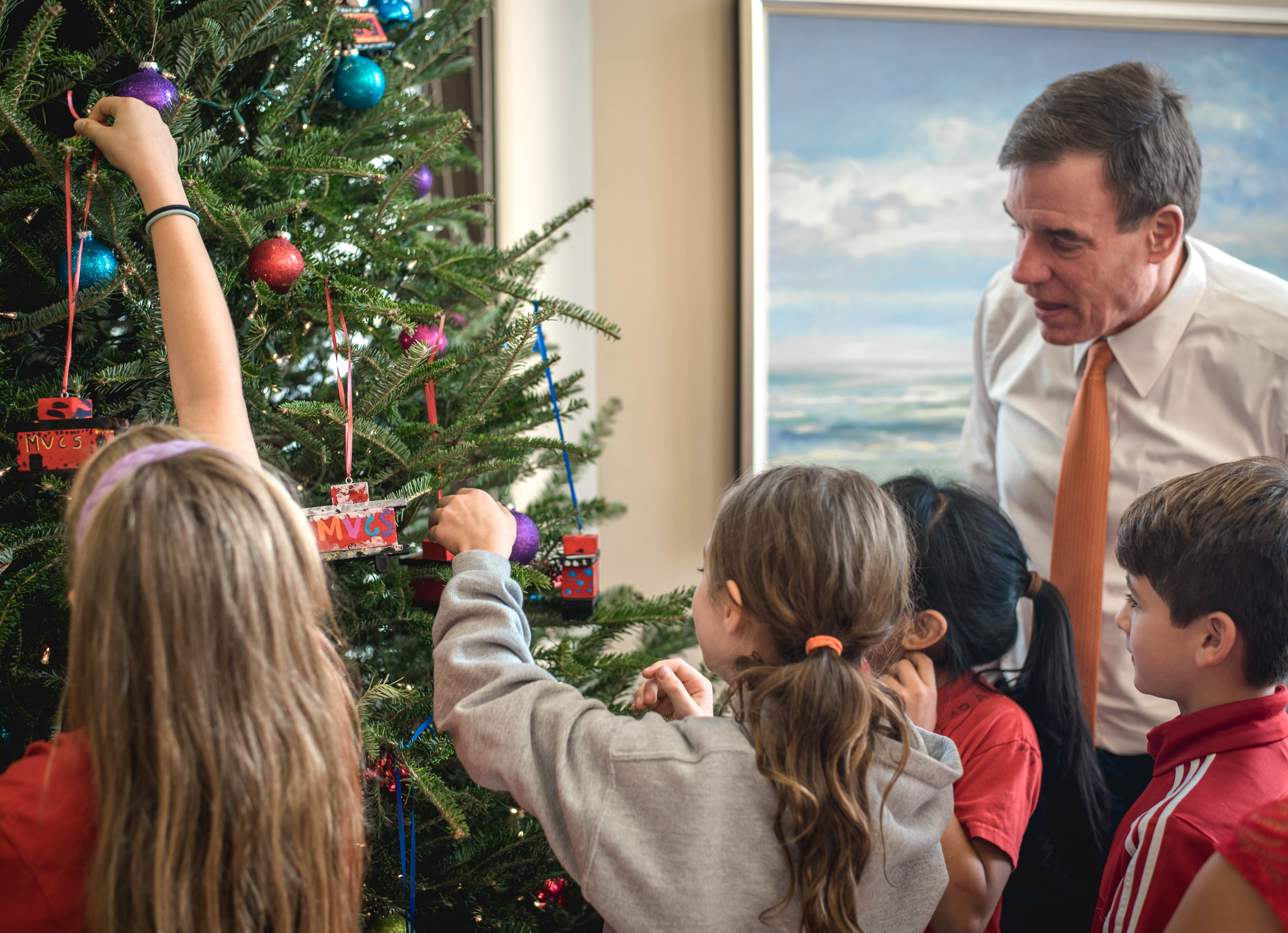
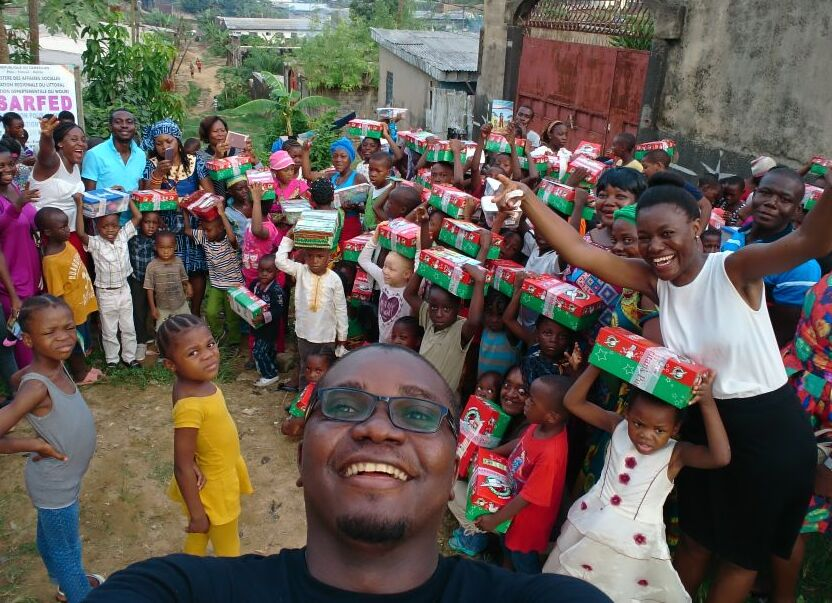
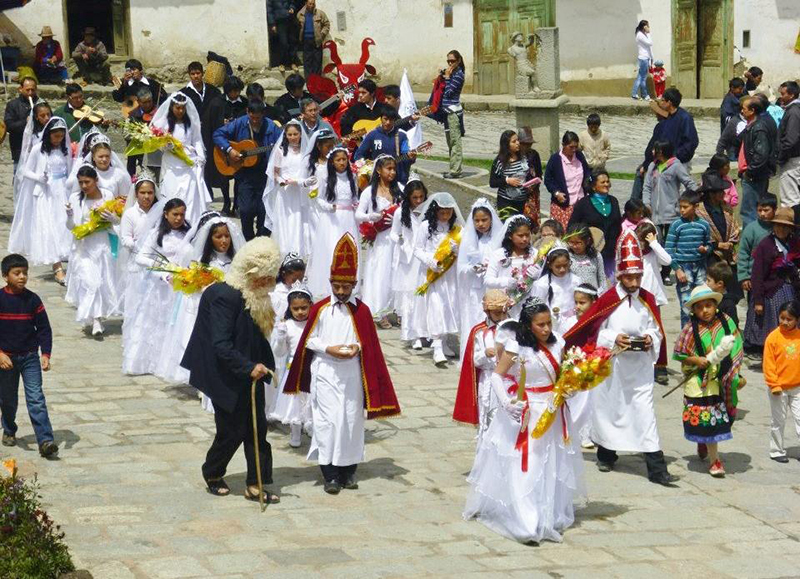
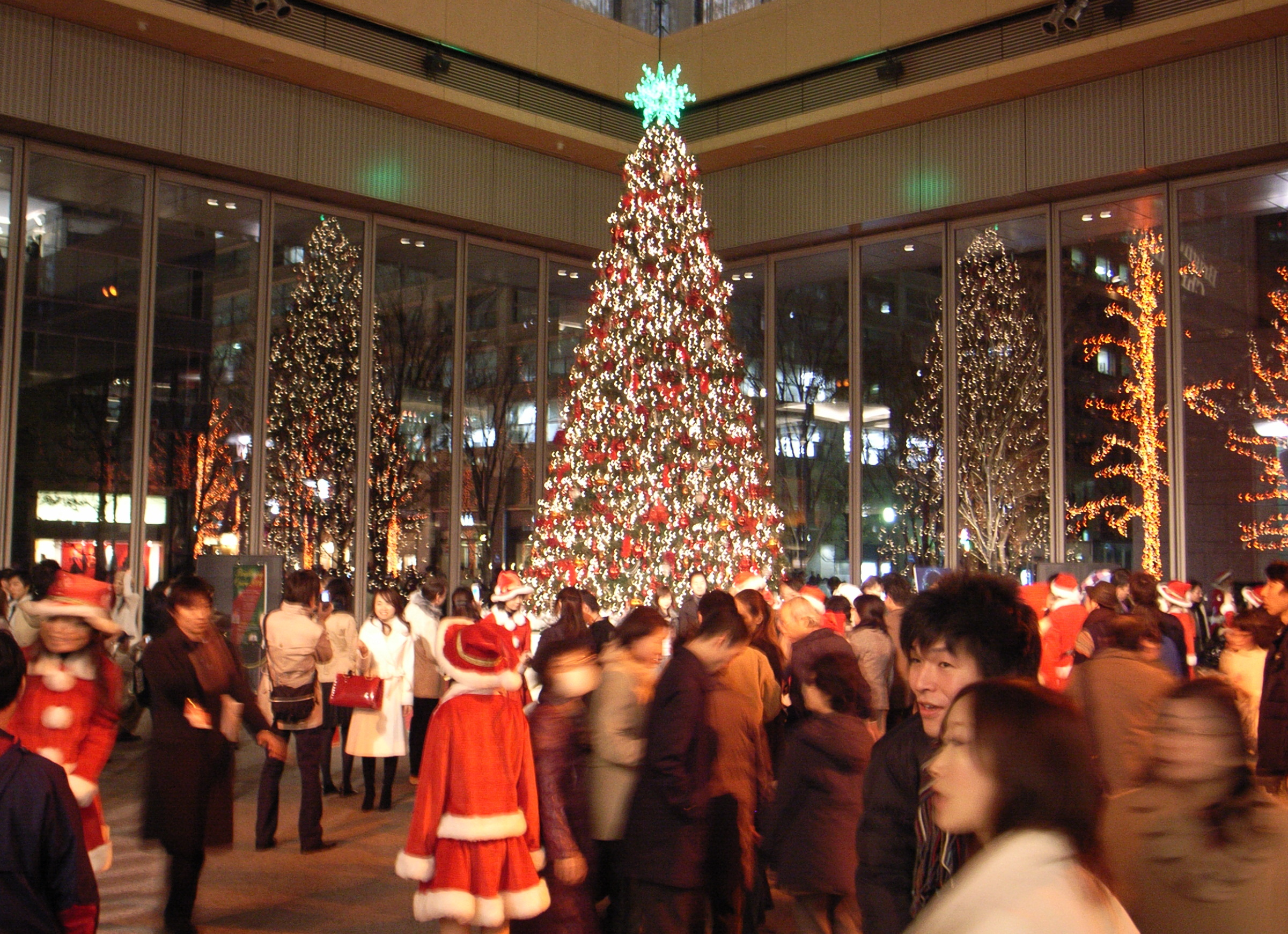
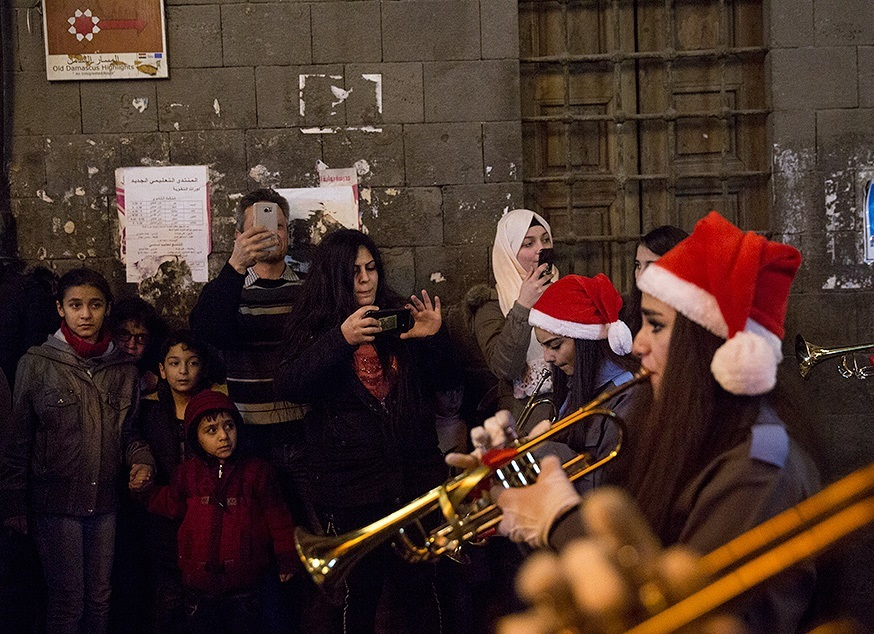
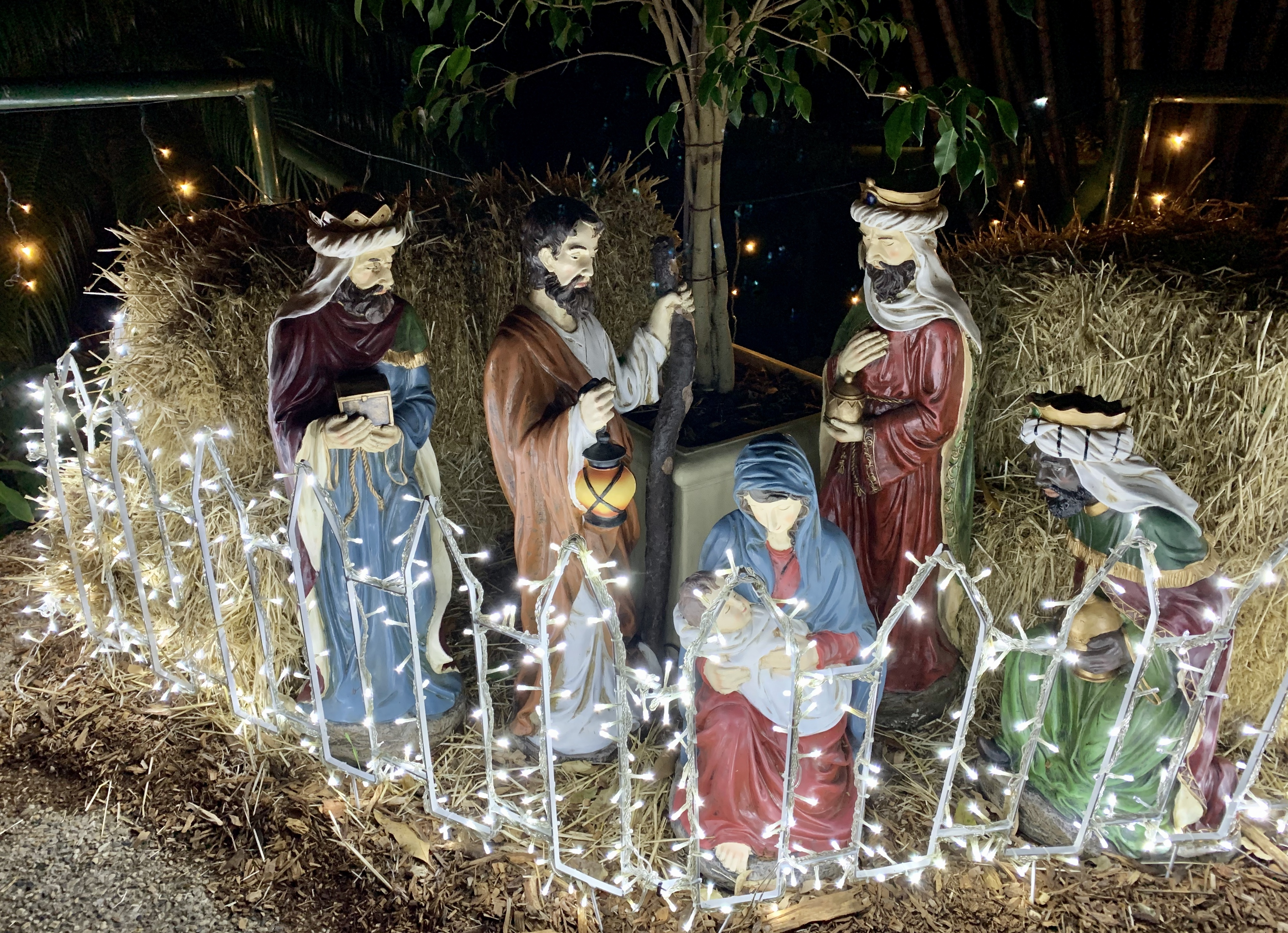
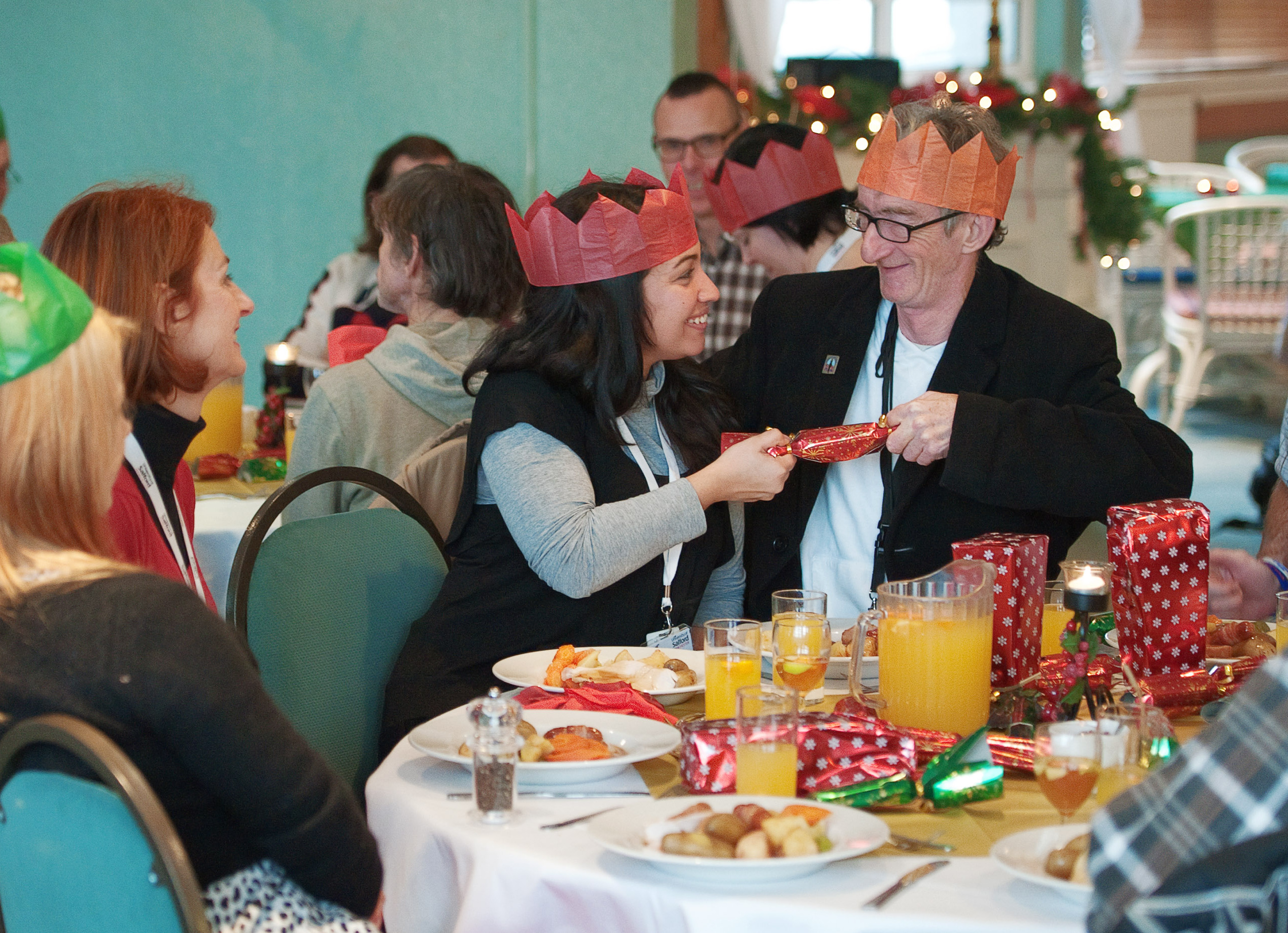
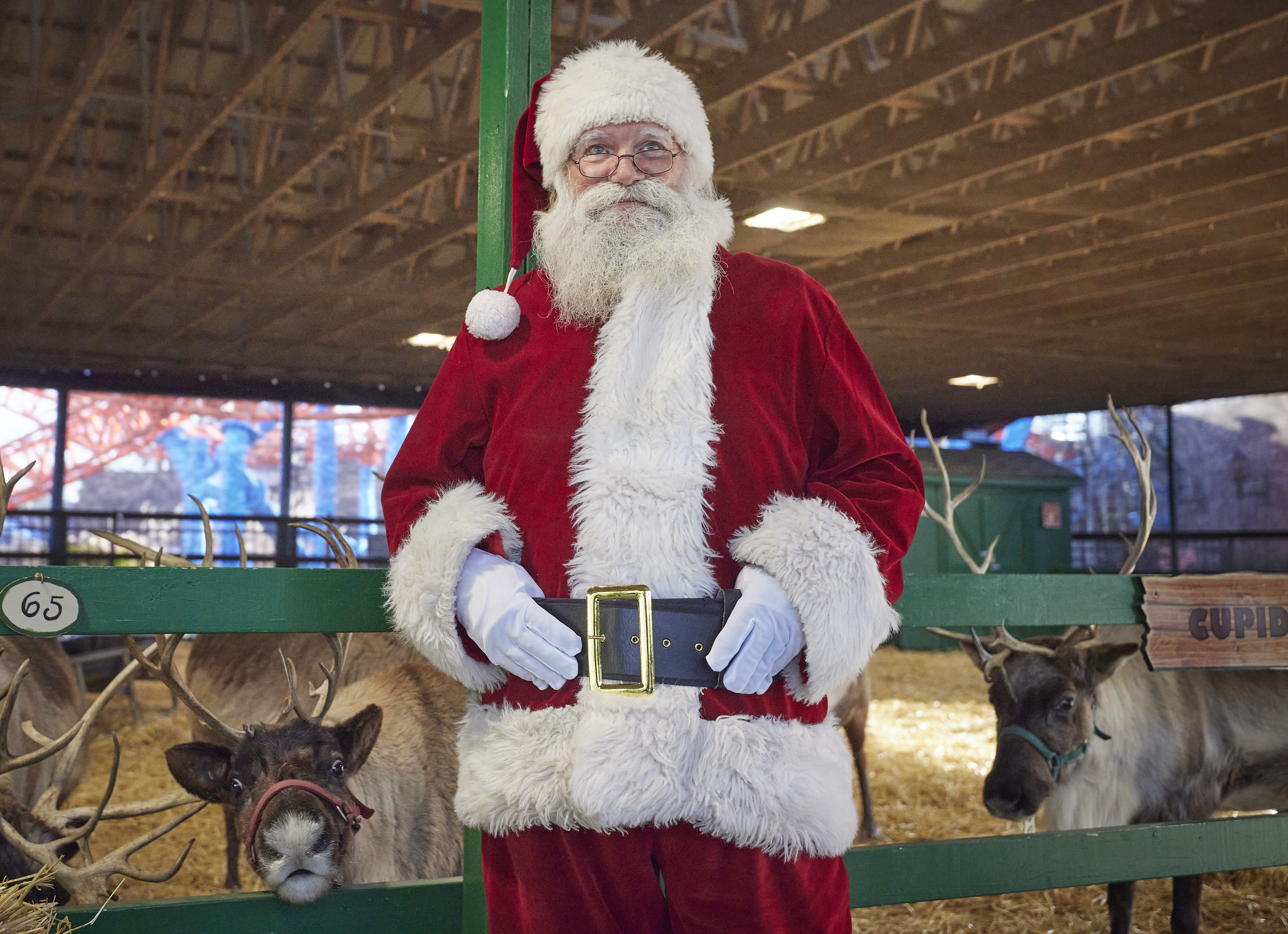
Christmas traditions around the world, From the top left, left to right: decorating a Christmas tree in Washington, D.C., receiving gifts in Cameroon, procession of Biblical Magi in Chacas, Christmas decoration in Tokyo, Christmas Carnival in Damascus, Nativity scene in Brisbane, Christmas crackers and Christmas dinner in Salford, Santa Claus in Hershey, Pennsylvania.

The observance of Christmas around the world varies by country and by religion. The day of Christmas, and in some cases the day before and the day after, are recognized by many national governments and cultures worldwide, including in areas where Christianity is a minority religion, which are usually found in Africa and Asia. In some non-Christian areas, periods of former colonial rule introduced the celebration (e.g., Hong Kong); in others, Christian minorities or foreign cultural influences have led populations to observe the holiday.

Christmas traditions for many nations include the installation and decoration of Christmas trees, the hanging of Advent wreaths, Christmas stockings, candy canes, setting out cookies and milk, the creation of Nativity scenes depicting the birth of Jesus Christ and giving and receiving of presents. The sending and exchange of Christmas cards, observance of fasting, and special religious observances such as a Midnight Mass or Vespers on Christmas Eve, and the burning of a Yule log are also common practices. Christmas carols may be sung and stories told about figures such as the Baby Jesus, Saint Nicholas, Santa Claus, Father Christmas, Christkind or Grandfather Frost. Along with Easter, Christmas is one of the most important periods on the Christian calendar and is often closely connected to other holidays at this time of year, such as Advent, the Feast of the Immaculate Conception, Saint Nicholas Day, Saint Stephen's Day, New Year's, and the Feast of the Epiphany.

Map of countries where Christmas is a formal public holiday either on 24/25 December or 6/7 January. Color shading indicates "days of rest". Note: Slovenia does have two days of rest, but the 26th is not a Christmas-related public holiday (Independence and Unity Day).

Many national governments recognize Christmas as an official public holiday, while others recognize it symbolically but not as an official legal observance. Countries in which Christmas is not a formal public holiday include Afghanistan, Algeria, Azerbaijan, Bahrain, Bhutan, Cambodia, China (except Hong Kong and Macau), the Comoros, Iran, Israel, Japan, Kuwait, Laos, Libya, the Maldives, Mauritania, Mongolia, Morocco, North Korea, Oman, Qatar, the Sahrawi Republic, Saudi Arabia, Somalia, Taiwan, Tajikistan, Thailand, Tunisia, Turkey, Turkmenistan, the United Arab Emirates, Uzbekistan, Vietnam, and Yemen. Countries such as Japan, where Christmas is not a public holiday but is popular despite there being only a small number of Christians, have adopted many of the secular aspects of Christmas, such as gift-giving, decorations, and Christmas trees.

Christmas celebrations around the world can vary markedly in form, reflecting differing cultural and national traditions. Among countries with a strong Christian tradition, a variety of Christmas celebrations have developed, incorporating regional and local cultures.

== Africa ==
=== Egypt ===
Christmas is celebrated by Coptic Christians in Egypt. It is largely celebrated on January 7th, which is a public holiday in Egypt.

=== Ethiopia and Eritrea ===
Christmas Day, known as Ledet in Eritrea and Gena in Ethiopia, is celebrated on January 7th (Tahsas 29th of the Ethiopian calendar). Many Christians in Eritrea and Ethiopia observe a 40-day fast before the holiday and culminate in dawn church services on Christmas morning. The day features vibrant musical celebrations with priests in ceremonial robes performing rituals, including dancing and drumming. A traditional hockey-like game called gena is played in the afternoon, with the community leader awarding a prize to the winner. Most Ethiopians wear a traditional shamma, a thin, white cotton wrap with brightly colored stripes at the ends. The celebration is followed by the three-day festival of Timkat, starting on 19 January, which commemorates the baptism of Jesus Christ.

=== Nigeria ===
Christmas Day is a public holiday in Nigeria. Urban Nigerians visit their ancestral villages to be with family and to bless the less fortunate. Nigerians visit markets to buy and transport live chickens, goats, and cows for the Christmas meals.

On Christmas Eve, traditional meals vary regionally. Nigerians tend to prepare various meats in large quantities. In the south, a dish called jollof rice is served with stews of various meats, along with boiled beans and fried plantains; in the north, rice and stew, as well as tuwon shinkafa, a rice pudding served with various meat stews, are preferred. In the north, several local desserts are also made. An alternative in both regions is a pepper soup with fish, goat, or beef, often served with fufu (pounded yams). Alcoholic drinks such as traditional palm wine or various local and imported beers and wines are consumed; children and women may be served soft drinks instead.

Gift giving in Nigeria often involves money and the flow of gifts from the more fortunate to the less fortunate. Nigerians assist relatives, often financially, during Christmastide. Cash and elaborately wrapped gifts may be given out at parties; sometimes cash is scattered in the air to be grabbed by others or stuck onto the sweaty foreheads of those dancing.

=== Senegal ===
Christmas is a popular holiday in the Muslim-majority country of Senegal.

=== South Africa ===
Christmas in South Africa is a public holiday celebrated on 25 December. Many European traditions are maintained, despite the distance from Europe.

Christmas trees are set up in homes, and children are given presents in their stockings. The Christmas meal can include mince pies, turkey, gammon, beef tongue, turducken, corned beef, green salad, roast beef, or a barbecue outdoors. The meal is finished with Christmas pudding, ice cream, or trifle. Christmas crackers are used to make noise.

=== Ghana ===
In Ghana, Christmas, known locally as Bronya, is celebrated on 25 December, with both 25 and 26 December recognized as public holidays.

== Americas ==
=== Cuba ===
The Communist Regime led by Fidel Castro abolished the paid Christmas holiday in 1969, citing the need for workers to continue the sugar harvest. In 1998, the regime declared 25 December a day of rest, as requested by Pope John Paul II as a condition for his visit to the country.

=== Guatemala ===
On Christmas in Guatemala, people dress up in an ornamental hat, called a puritina, and dance in a line. As with much of the country's culture, the celebration includes Spanish and Mayan elements.

=== Canada ===
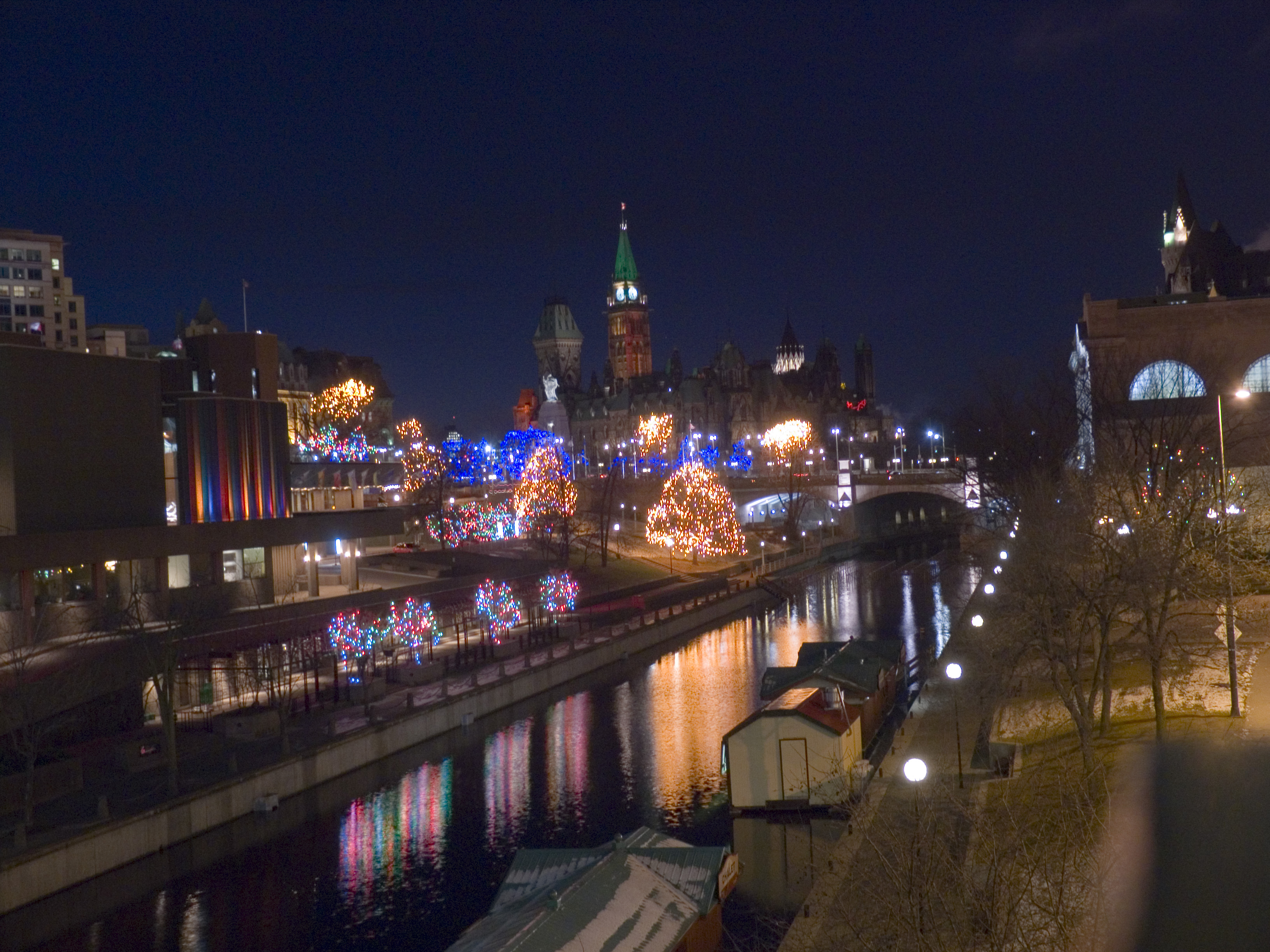
Christmas in Ottawa, Canada

Christmas Day is one of five Canadian statutory holidays observed nationwide, and Boxing Day is a federal holiday that is also observed in select provinces. Christmas Eve is not a statutory holiday in any jurisdiction, but many businesses and government entities individually choose to close early or for the entire day on 24 December. In the Canadian provinces where English is the predominant language, Christmas traditions are largely similar to those of the United States, with some lingering influences from the United Kingdom and newer traditions brought by immigrants from other European countries. Mince pies, plum pudding, and Christmas cake are traditionally served as Christmas dinner desserts, following the traditional meal of roast turkey, stuffing, potatoes, and winter vegetables. Christmas table crackers are not uncommon and, in some parts of Newfoundland, Prince Edward Island and Nova Scotia, Christmas traditions include mummers.

North American influences on Christmas are evident in the hanging of stockings on Christmas Eve, to be filled by Santa Claus. Canadian children believe that the home of Santa Claus is located at the North Pole, in Canada, and, through Canada Post, address thousands of letters to Santa Claus each year, using the postal code designation H0H 0H0.

As Canada is a cold, dark country in winter, lights are often put up in public places and on commercial and residential buildings in November and December. Many communities have celebrations that include light events, such as the Cavalcade of Lights Festival in Toronto, the Montreal Christmas Fireworks, or the Bright Nights in Stanley Park, Vancouver. A national program, Christmas Lights Across Canada (later renamed to Winter Lights Across Canada), illuminates Ottawa, the national capital, and the 13 provincial and territorial capitals.

In the province of Quebec, Christmas traditions include réveillon, Père Noël ('Father Christmas'), and the bûche de Noël (Yule log), among many others.

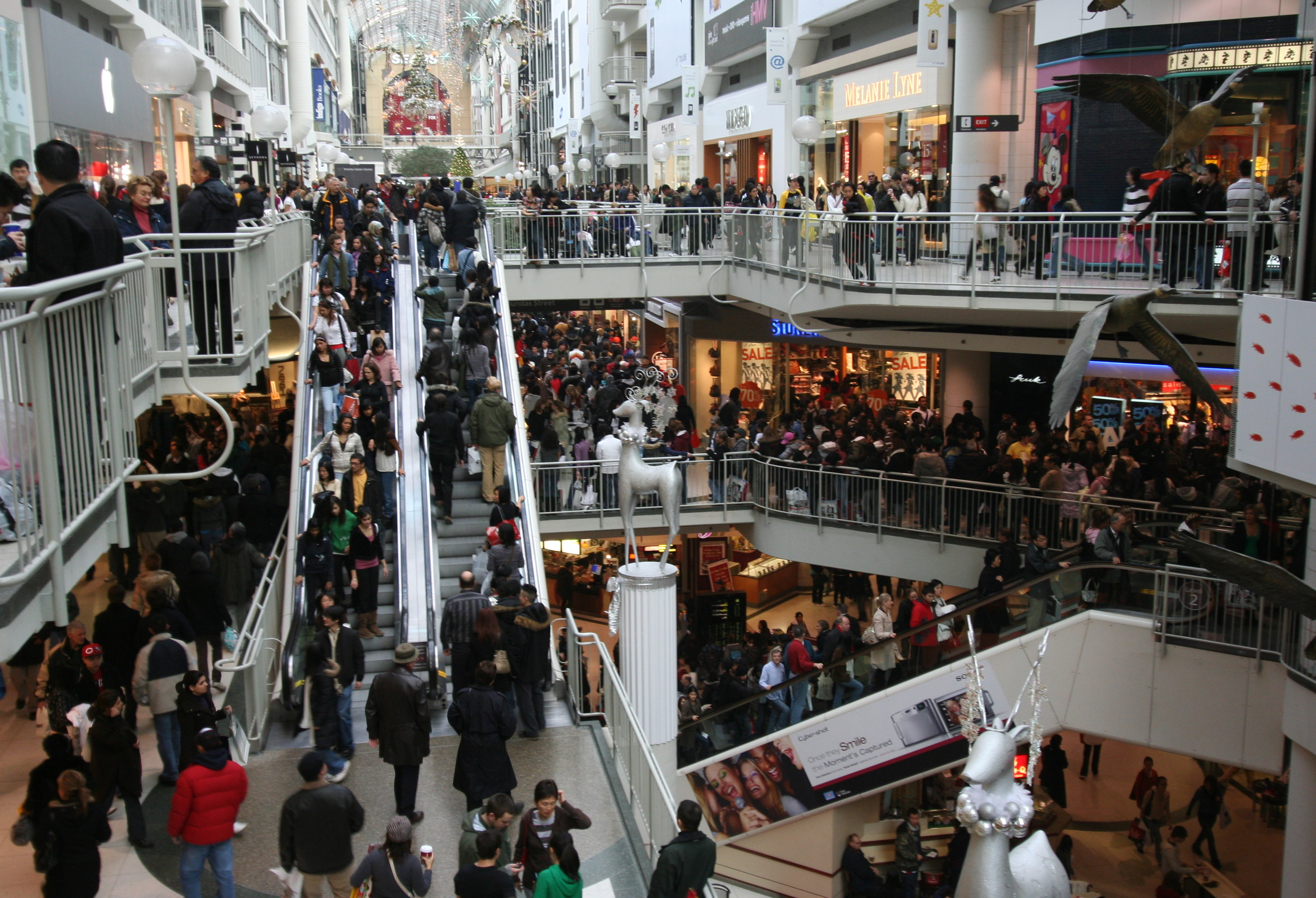
Boxing Day at the Toronto Eaton Centre in downtown Toronto, Canada

=== Mexico ===
Since the 1990s, Mexican society has embraced a new concept linking several celebrations around the Christmas season into what is known as the Guadalupe-Reyes Marathon. At midnight on Christmas, after Midnight Mass, many families place the figure of baby Jesus in their nacimientos (Nativity scenes) at home, as a symbolic representation of Christmas as a whole. In the central and southern parts of Mexico, children receive gifts on Christmas Eve. On 6 January, they celebrate the Feast of the Epiphany which is when the Three Wise Men brought gifts to Bethlehem for Jesus Christ. Santa Claus (or Santa Clos, as he is known in Mexico) is the one who brings the children their gifts. Still, traditionally on that night, the Three Wise Men will fill the children's shoes with candies, oranges, tangerines, nuts, and sugar cane. Sometimes money or gold are given and it symbolizes the very gifts they gave to the Baby Jesus in Bethlehem during his infancy and a reflection of his future destiny as savior of the world. Big parties and events mark 6 January.

=== United States ===
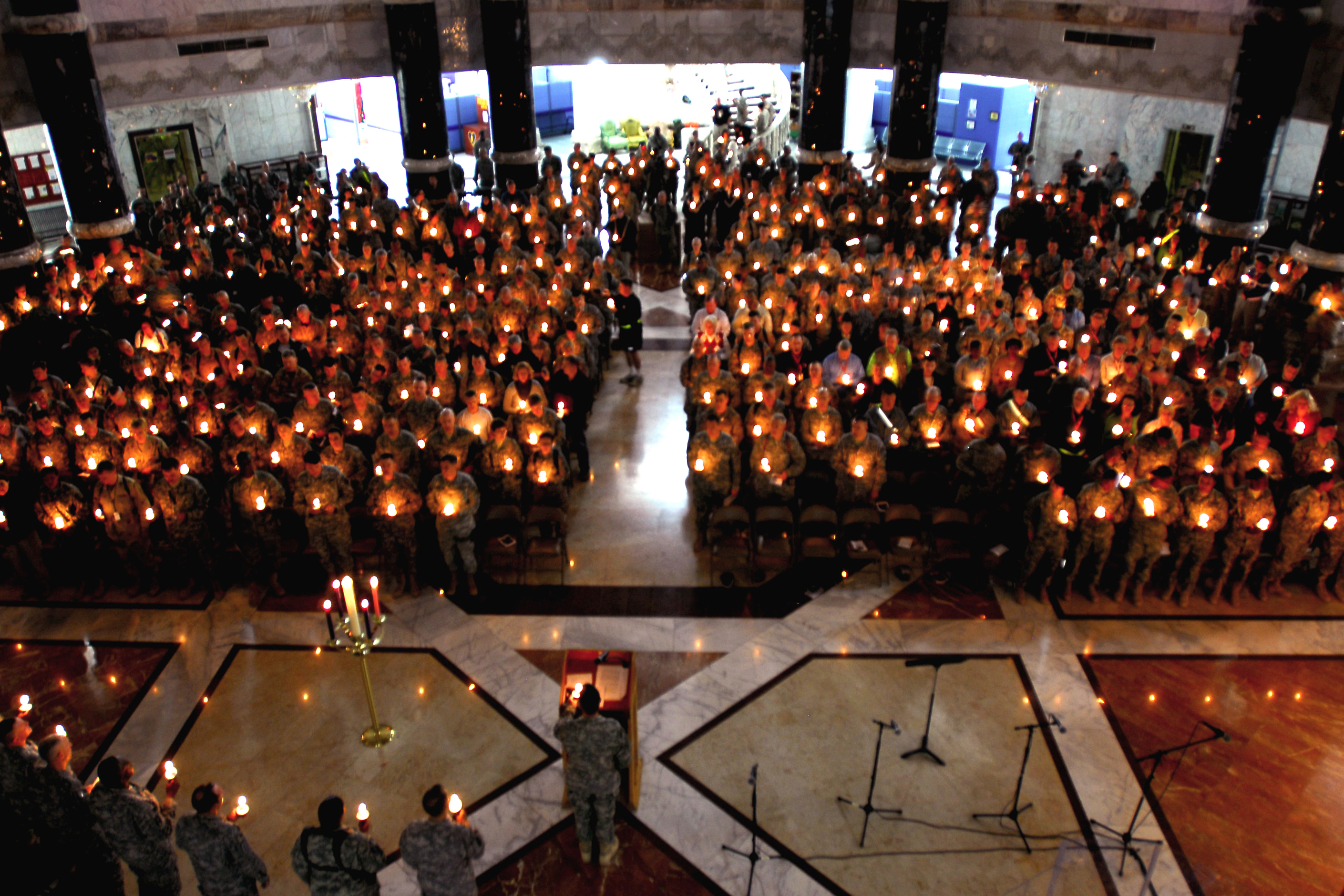
U.S. Army Service members celebrating Christmas Eve while stationed abroad at Victory Base Complex, Iraq, 24 December 2008

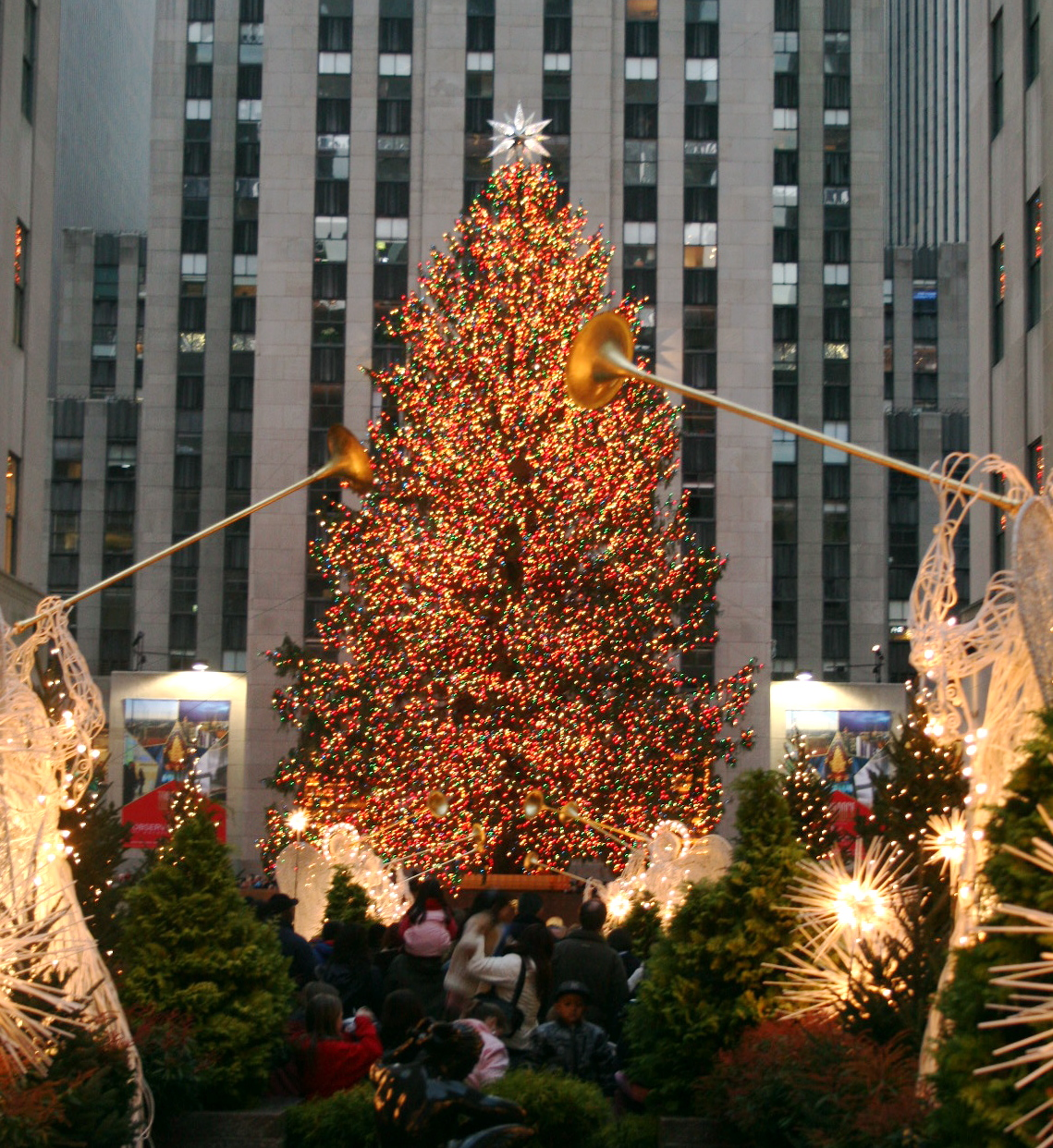
Christmas at Rockefeller Center, New York City

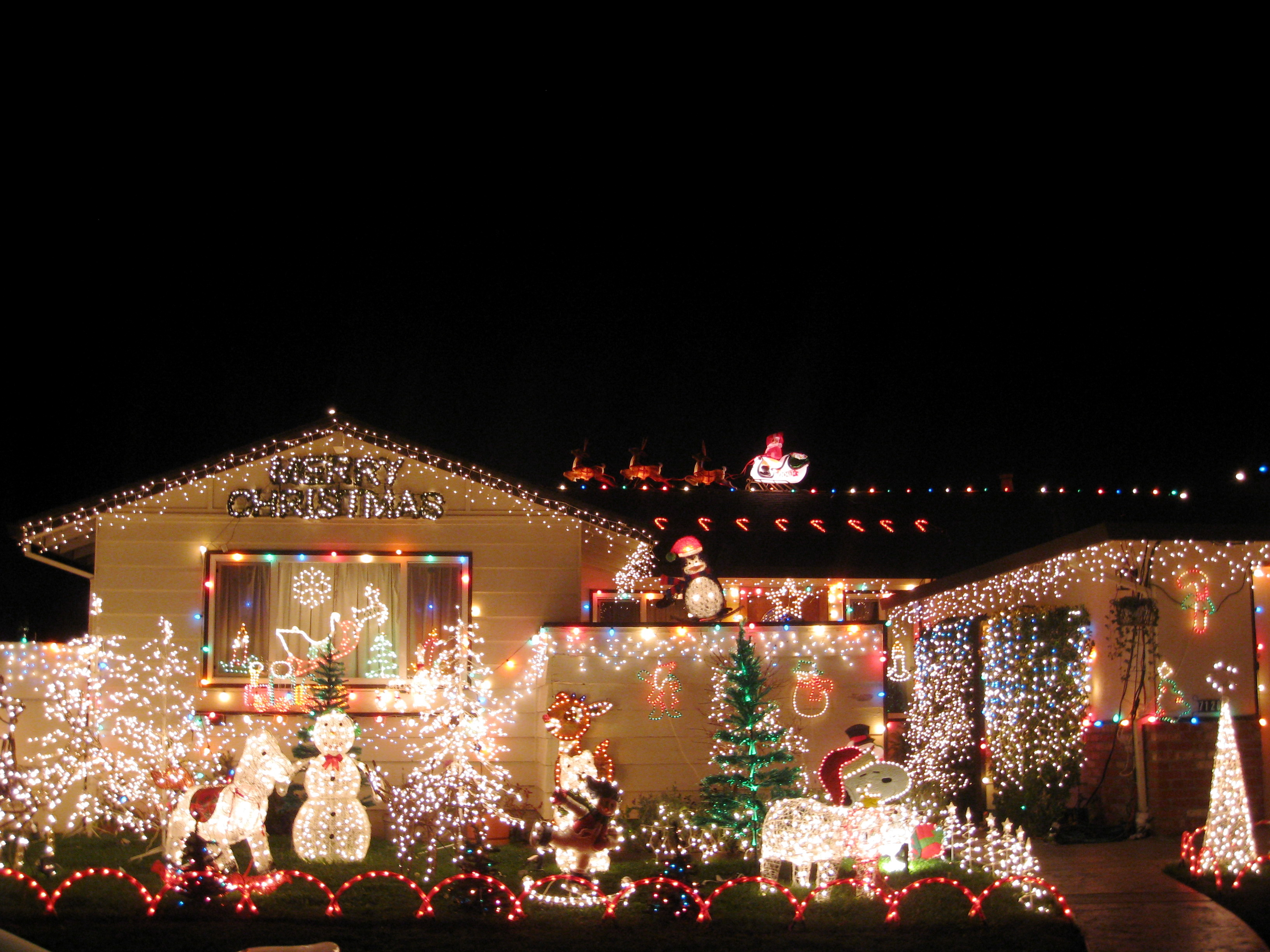
Christmas in California

Christmas is a common holiday in the United States, and Christmas Day is officially recognized as a federal holiday by the U.S. government. In select years, Christmas Eve is declared by the president via executive order to be a federal holiday, and the latest directive having been since 24 December 2024. Any occurrence of Friday 24 December is a federal holiday, under the policy that when the usual date for a federal holiday falls on a weekend day, the legal holiday is observed on the nearest weekday. 26 December, popularly referred to as Boxing Day or Saint Stephen's Day elsewhere in the Western world, is only known widely as the "Day after Christmas" in the U.S., and is observed in some states under that name, but is not a federal holiday.

The interiors and exteriors of houses are decorated during the weeks leading up to Christmas Eve. Christmas tree farms in the United States and Canada provide families with trees for their homes, many opting for artificial ones, but some have real ones. The Christmas tree usually stands centrally in the home, decorated with ornaments, tinsel, and lights, with an angel or a star, symbolizing the Star of Bethlehem at the top.

Santa Claus hands gifts to children.

The family will exchange presents wrapped and placed near the tree, including gifts for pets.

The traditional Christmas dinner usually features either roasted turkey with stuffing (or dressing), ham, or roast beef. Potatoes, squash, roasted vegetables, and cranberry sauce are served along with tonics and sherries. A variety of sweet pastries and eggnog sprinkled with cinnamon and nutmeg are served in the United States. Certain dishes, such as casseroles and desserts, are often prepared with a family recipe. Sometimes, families also partake in a religious tradition, such as consuming a Christmas wafer in Christian families of European ancestry. Fruits, nuts, cheeses, and chocolates are enjoyed as snacks.

Local radio stations may temporarily switch format to play Christmas music exclusively, some going to an all-Christmas format as early as mid-October. As of 2008, the NBA now schedules five games on Christmas, usually including classic rivalry games as well as a rematch of the previous season's NBA Finals.

=== Brazil ===
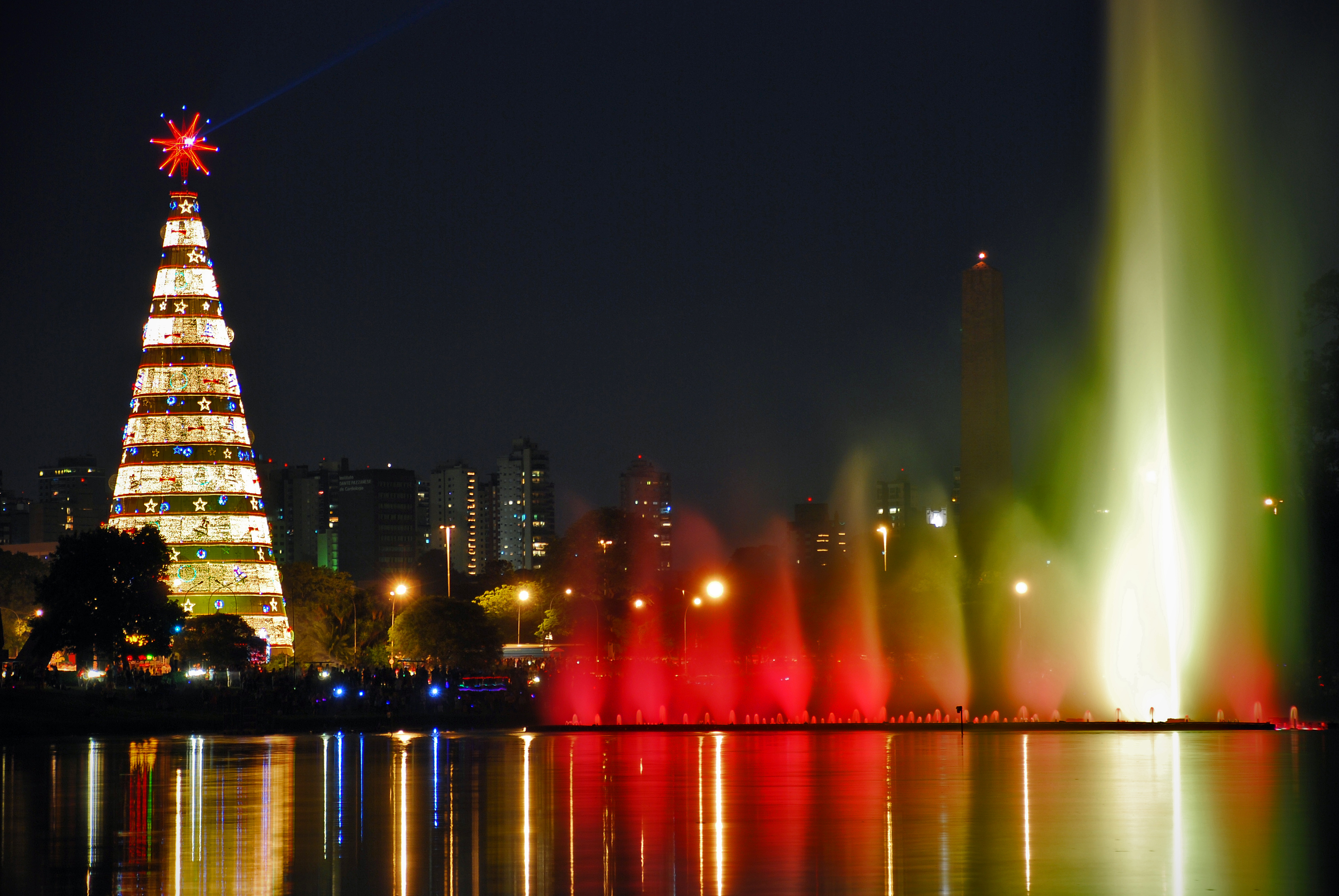
São Paulo's Christmas tree and water fountains at Ibirapuera Park

Many Brazilians decorate their homes with a Christmas Tree. There is no rule, and the parents can decorate it themselves as a surprise for the kids, or do it together. In addition to the Christmas tree, many families set up a presépio (nativity scene) as the main decoration. Nativity scenes are very popular in Brazil, and can be seen everywhere, including churches and popular places around the town. As in many other countries, Christmas dinner in Brazil is typically served late on Christmas Eve, around 10 or 11 p.m. The meal often includes farofa stuffing, an assortment of fruit, fried cod, and roast turkey, with a dessert called rabanada. Along with their meals, Brazilians typically drink champagne, wine, and fruit punch. Typically, after they eat, many Brazilians attend Midnight Mass or watch the Pope's televised celebration of "Midnight Mass in Rome" with family and friends.

=== Colombia ===
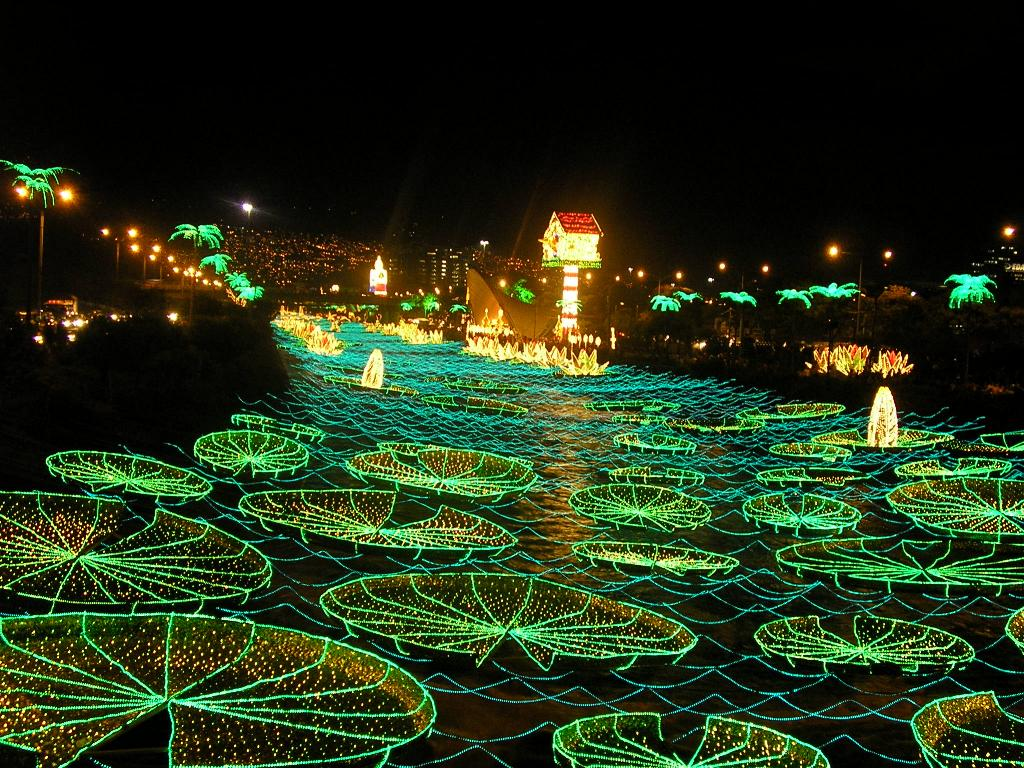
Medellín River during the Lighting of Medellin

From 16 to 24 December, games called aguinaldos are played after having made a "pinky promise" deciding the prize for the winner and the punishment for the loser. The games include Hablar y no contestar ('Talk but don't answer'), Dé pero no reciben ('Give but don't receive'), Pajita en boca ('Straw in the mouth'), Tres pies ('Three feet'), Beso robado ('Stolen kisses'), and Si y al no ('Yes or no'). Churches offer dawn and nightly masses during the nine days of the novena, culminating with the Misa de Gallo ('Rooster's Mass') on Christmas Eve at midnight.

=== Uruguay ===
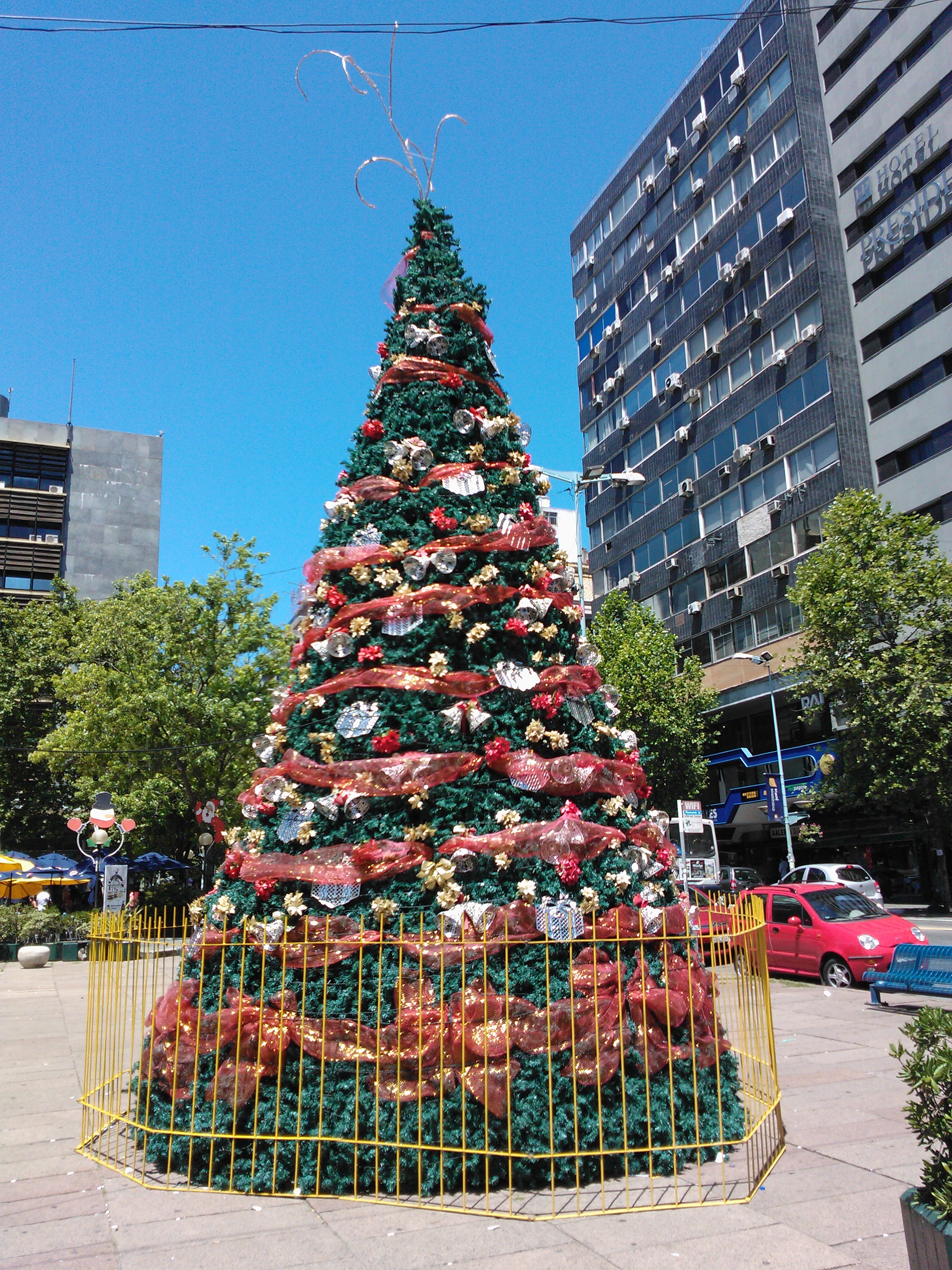
A Christmas tree in Plaza Fabini in Montevideo

Christmas Day, 25 December, is a public holiday in Uruguay and is officially designated within the public administration as Día de la Familia (Spanish for 'Family Day'), a term adopted following the separation of church and state in the early 20th century. In everyday life, the date is universally known as Navidad (Spanish for 'Christmas'). The Christmas and holiday season begins on 8 December, the Feast of the Immaculate Conception, when the Christmas tree is traditionally set up and festive decorations are placed in homes, shops and public streets. Many households also assemble a belén or pesebre (nativity scene). In many cities, Christmas markets are set up, offering toys, clothing, decorations and food.

In addition to traditional Christmas decorations, it is common among Uruguayan Christians to display a balcony banner depicting the Nativity scene and bearing the phrase "Christmas with Jesus". These banners were introduced in 2016 as part of a campaign by the Catholic Church in Uruguay to "raise awareness about the true meaning of the holiday" in a highly secular country. Pope Francis welcomed the initiative and was photographed with one in the Vatican City.

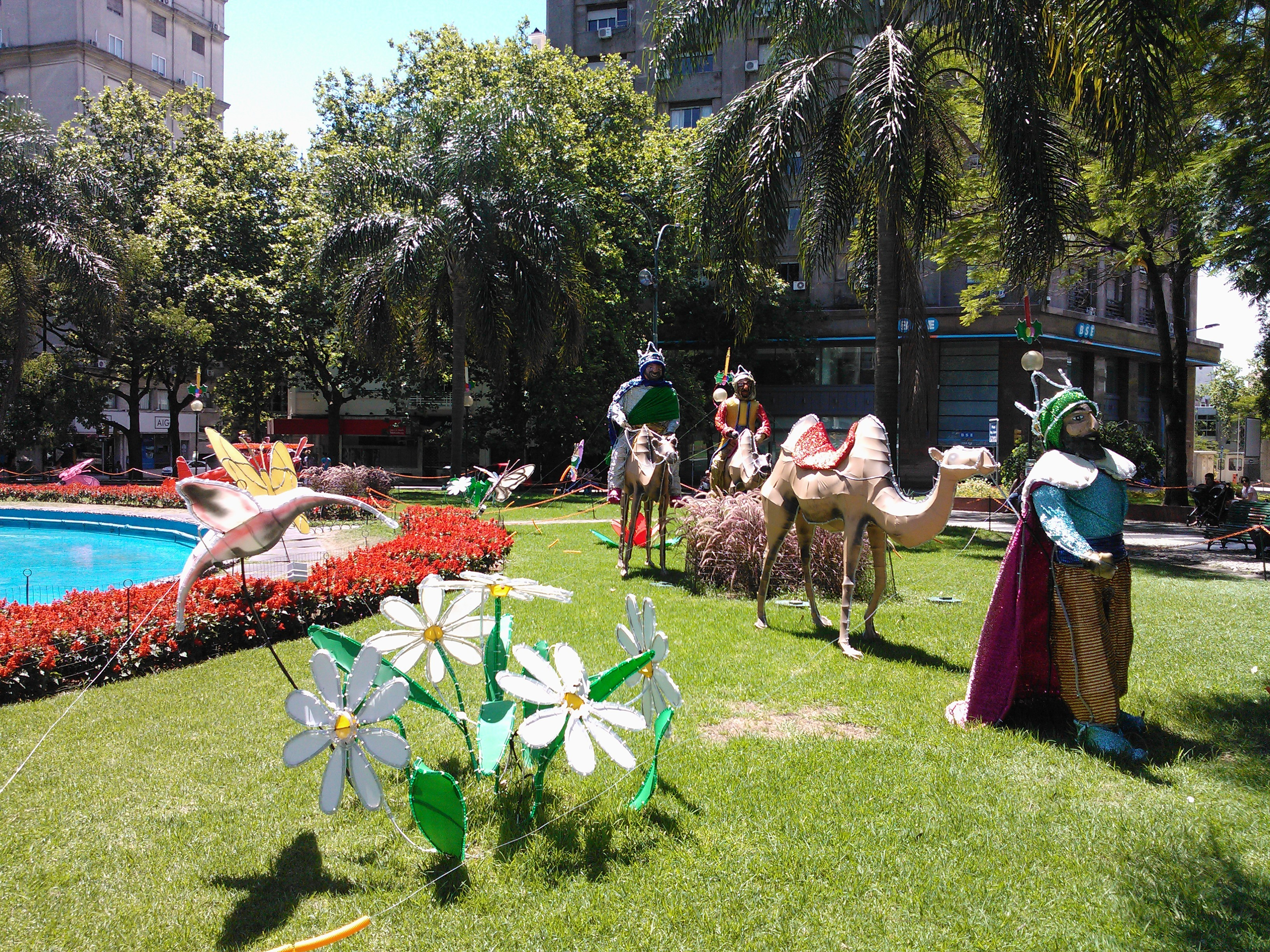
Sculptures of the Three Wise Men in Montevideo

The celebrations begin at nightfall on Christmas Eve (24 December), with family gatherings where people traditionally eat asado, picada, vitél toné, and desserts such as turrón and panetone, which entered Uruguayan culture through European immigration. At the stroke of midnight, people take to the streets to enjoy fireworks and set off firecrackers, while Papá Noel (Santa Claus) leaves, beside the Christmas tree, the gifts that children requested in letters they had deposited throughout the month in shopping centres and other places where he appears. Gift exchanges among family and friends are also customary.

Because Uruguay lies in the Southern Hemisphere, Christmas is celebrated during the summer. As a result, open-air music festivals are held from midday on 24 December and continue into the early hours of the 25th, particularly in coastal cities such as Montevideo and Punta del Este, which attract large numbers of tourists from neighbouring countries. On Christmas Day, the population has the day off to spend with family and friends, and public transport, shopping malls and offices remain closed.

=== Venezuela ===
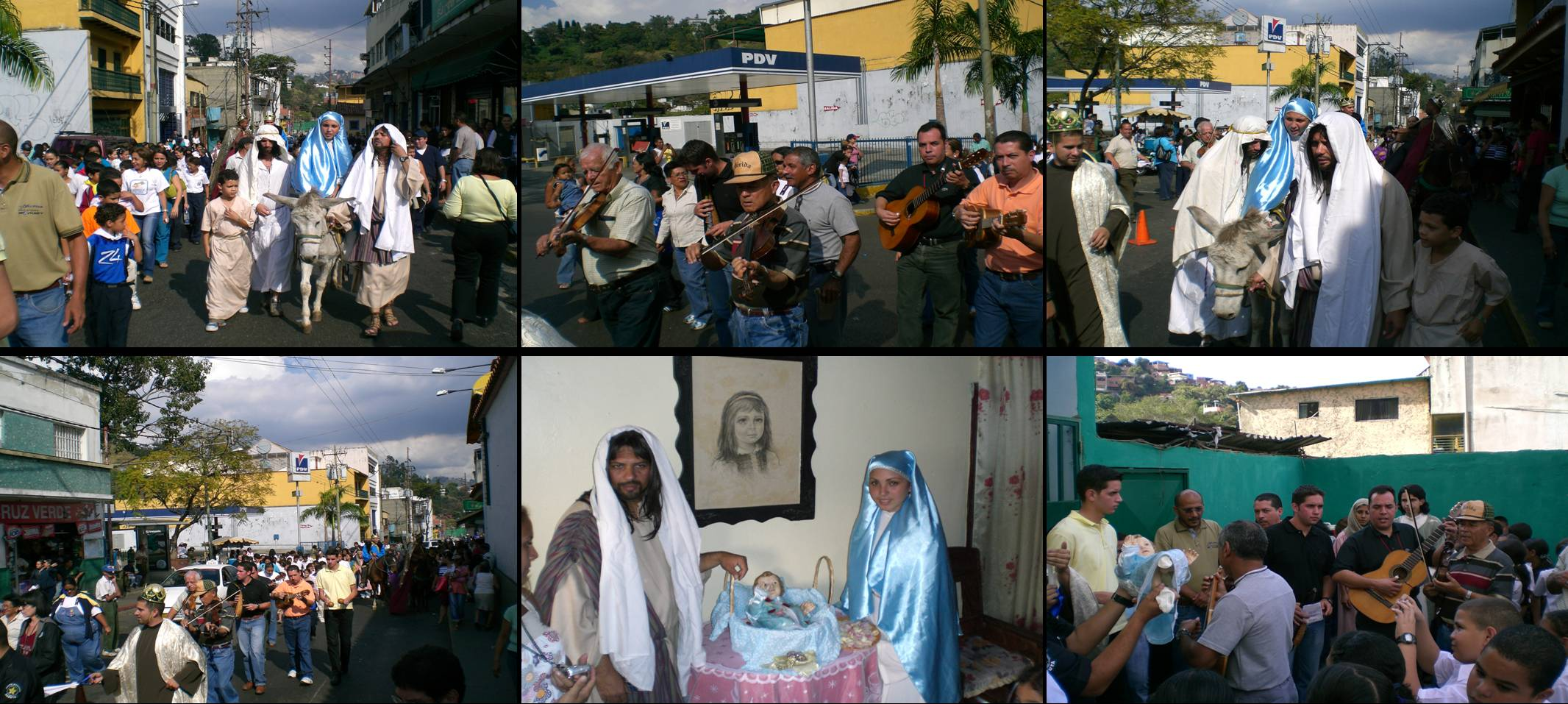
Different moments of Paradura del Niño, Venezuelan tradition celebrated on February 2

The Christmas season starts as early as 1 October, and ends in mid-January. Christmas decorations and songs become more prominent as Christmas nears.

== Asia ==
=== Central Asia ===
==== Uzbekistan ====
Christmas is not an official holiday in Uzbekistan. Out of a population of 35 million, approximately 2.2 percent is Russian Orthodox. Since the fall of the Soviet Union, this number has continued to decline as ethnic Russians and other Orthodox Christians emigrate to Russia and other countries. The Christians of Uzbekistan celebrate Christmas on 25 December in the Julian calendar used by the church, which falls on 7 January in the common Gregorian calendar

As in the rest of the Soviet Union, Christmas was largely erased from the calendar under the Soviets' anti-religious policies for much of the 20th century, but many traditions survived, transplanted to New Year's.

Christmas symbols and decorations similar to those found in Europe or the US can be seen on the streets of larger cities, but for a majority of the population Christmas is simply a part of New Year celebrations. Many people, including Muslims, decorate a Christmas tree, even though they do not celebrate Christmas and call the tree New Year's tree (Uzbek: Yangi yil archasi).

=== East Asia ===
==== China ====
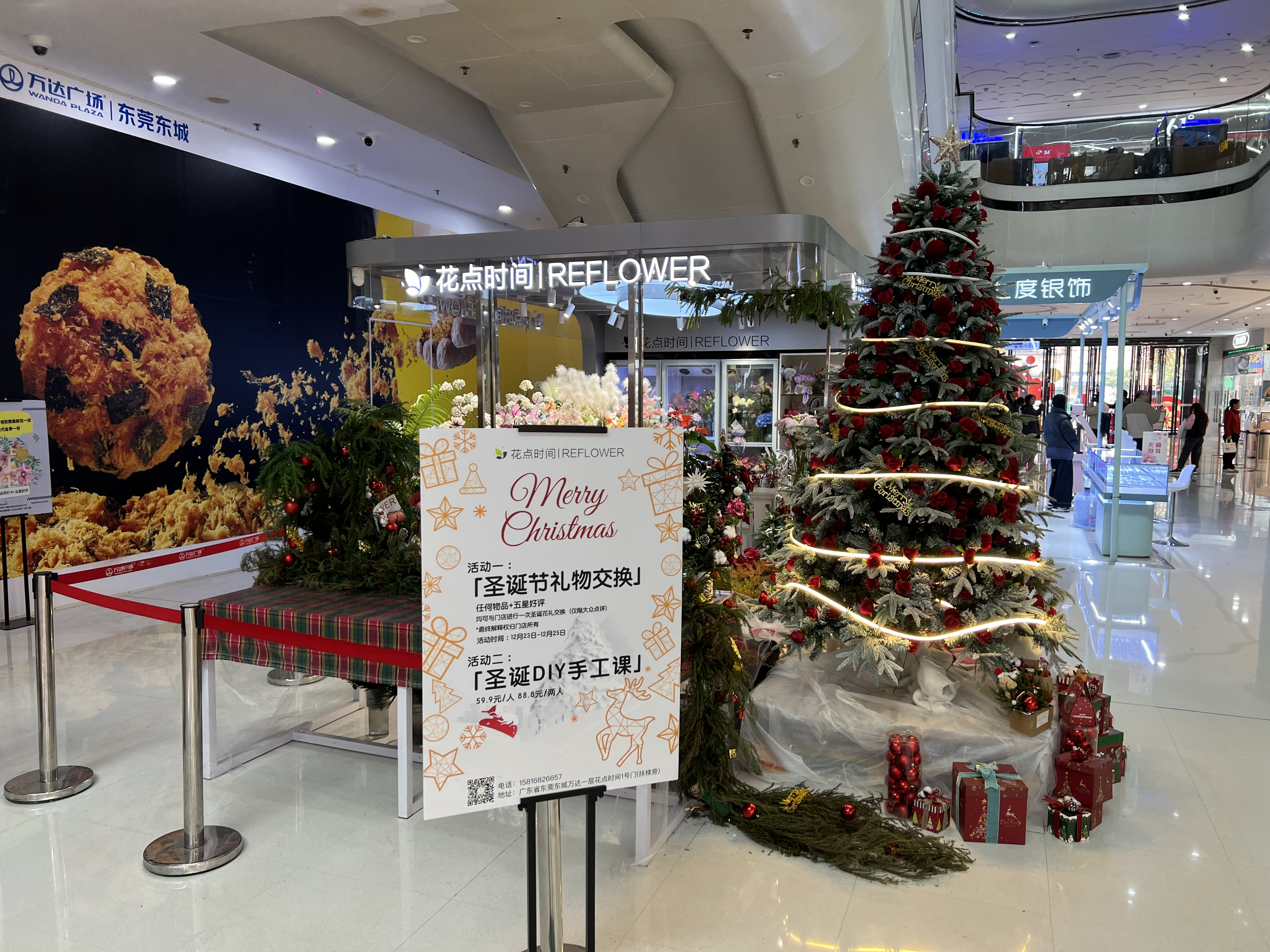
Christmas 2024 in Dongguan

In the mainland, the small percentage of Chinese citizens who consider themselves Christians unofficially, and usually privately, observe Christmas. Many other individuals celebrate Christmas-like festivities even though they do not consider themselves Christians. Many customs, including sending cards, exchanging gifts, and hanging stockings, are very similar to Western celebrations. Commercial Christmas decorations, signs, and other symbolic items have become increasingly prevalent during December in large urban centers of mainland China, reflecting a cultural interest in this Western phenomenon, and, sometimes, retail marketing campaigns as well.

===== Hong Kong =====
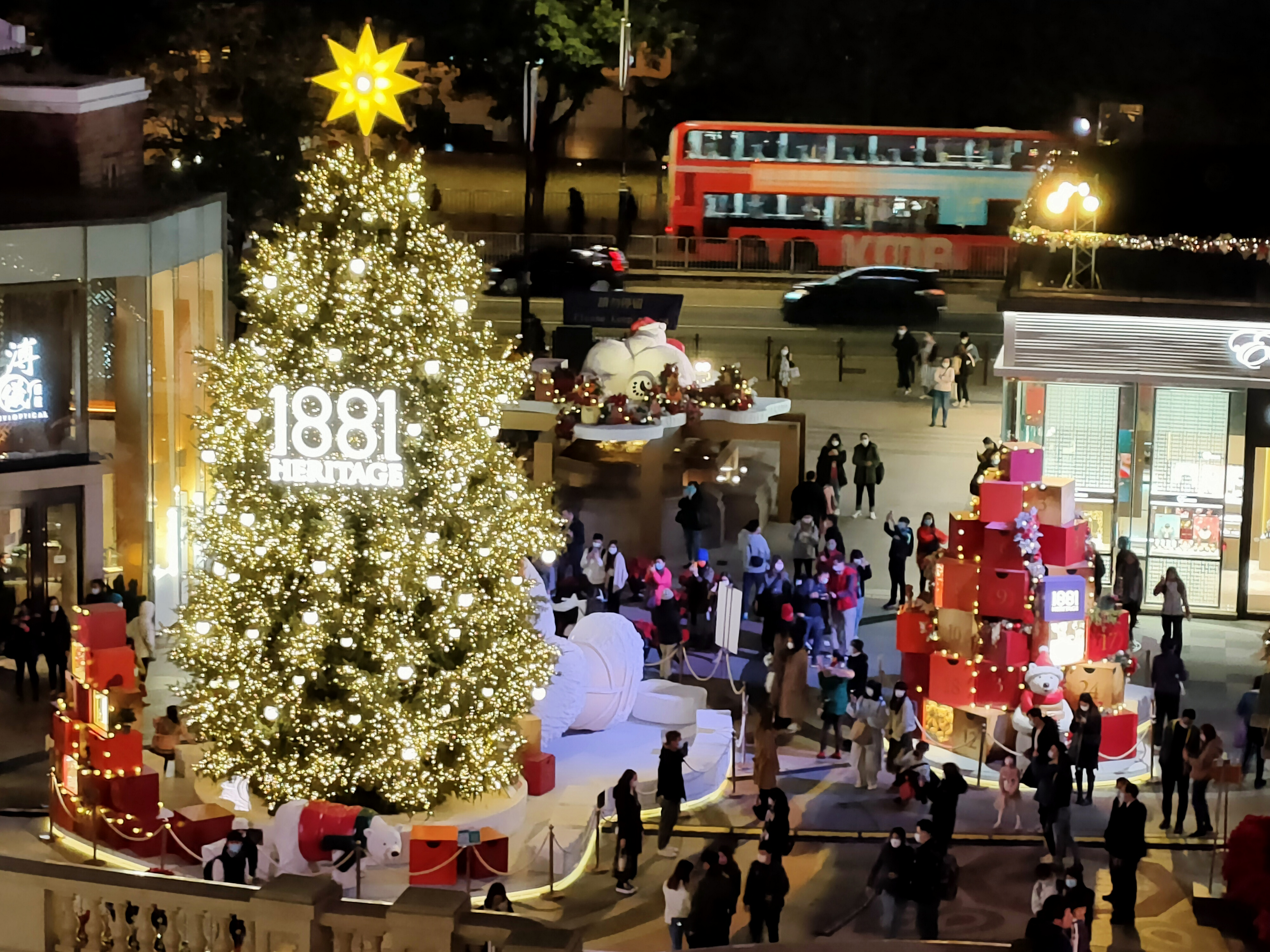
Christmas 2020 in Tsim Sha Tsui

Christmas trees can be seen everywhere, and a giant 15-meter-high Christmas tree is erected in the Statue Square, Central. Many citizens start related activities in early December, such as attending Christmas parties, having Christmas dinners and exchanging Christmas gifts. Protestant and Catholic religious leaders in Hong Kong publish Christmas announcements on Christmas Eve. Although 24 December, the day before Christmas, is not a holiday, some businesses let employees and bosses off work early, and the stock market only opens in the morning on that day. Christmas Eve at night is the climax of the festive atmosphere. Tsim Sha Tsui, Causeway Bay, and Lan Kwai Fong in Central are crowded with people enjoying Christmas lights and carnivals. Churches and chapels hold Midnight Mass that evening, and some Protestants and Catholics attend religious gatherings. Most shops, restaurants, and entertainment venues are still open during Christmas. At the same time, public transportation, such as the MTR and buses, is available overnight on Christmas Eve. All primary and secondary schools, kindergartens and tertiary institutions in Hong Kong will have Christmas holidays. Most primary and secondary schools usually hold the Christmas Party on 20 or 21 December. Then the Christmas holidays continue until New Year's Day, so Christmas and Lunar New Year are the longest consecutive holiday period of the year, except for summer vacation. Student organizations at colleges and universities will also hold Christmas parties starting in mid-December. Students at colleges and universities usually do not need to attend classes from Christmas Day to New Year's Day. Hong Kong citizens use the Christmas holidays to meet friends and family for gatherings, shopping, and pastimes. At the same time, young people like to spend the holidays as a couple or to find partners during the holidays, such as on Valentine's Day. In addition, people in Hong Kong generally believe that Christmas gifts should not be opened until Boxing Day, on 26 December. Some children write to Santa Claus; the letters are sent to the "Undeliverable mail" department of the Post Office, and the staff of the department responds as Santa Claus to each letter.

==== Japan ====
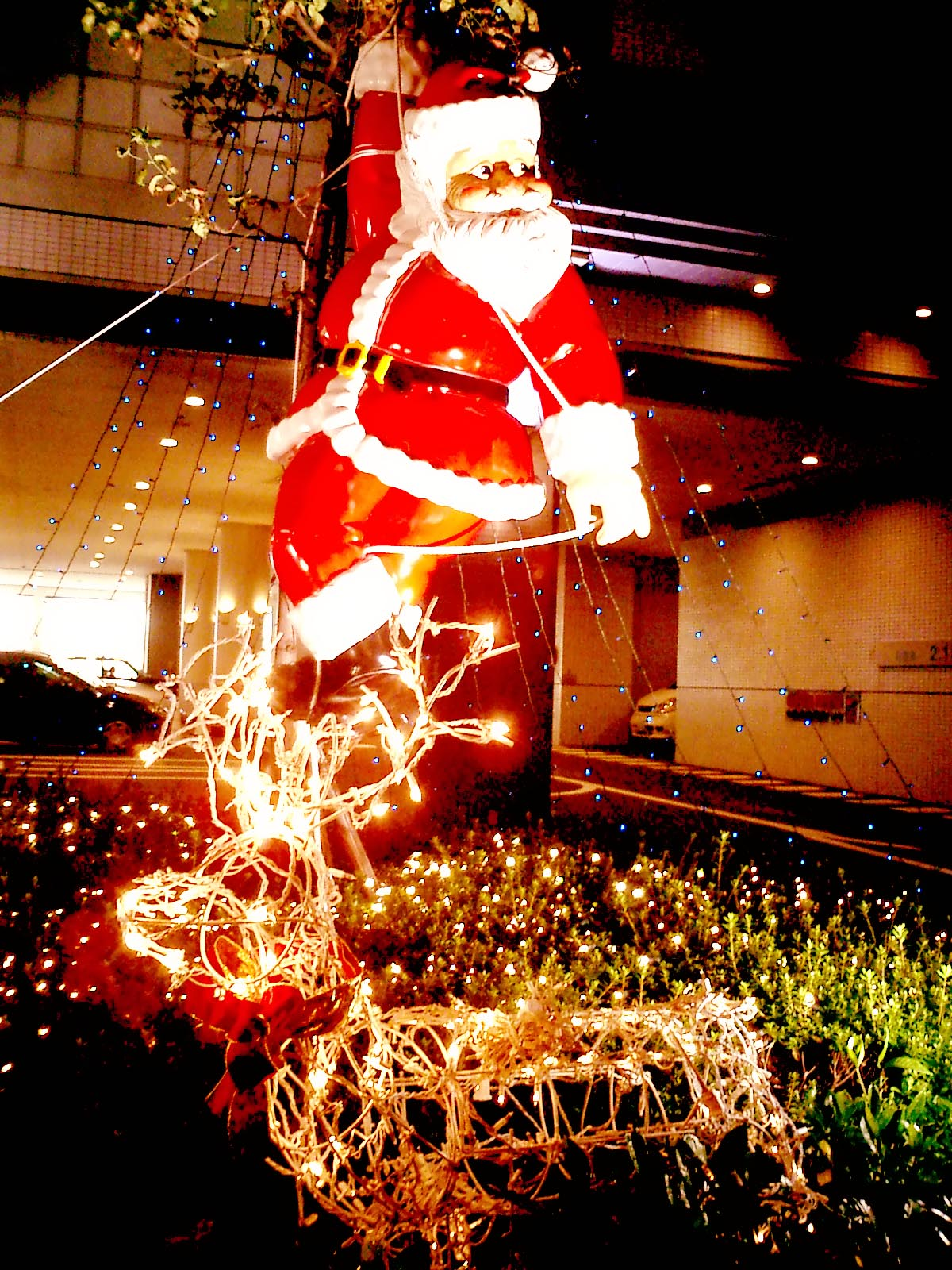
Santa Claus in Kobe, Japan

Encouraged by commerce, the secular celebration of Christmas is popular in Japan, though Christmas is not a national holiday. Gifts are sometimes exchanged. Christmas parties are held around Christmas Day; Japanese Christmas cake, a white sponge cake covered with cream and decorated with strawberries, is often consumed, and Stollen cake, either imported or made locally, is widely available. Christmas lights decorate cities, and Christmas trees adorn living areas and malls. Christmas Eve has become a holiday for couples to spend time together and exchange gifts. A successful advertising campaign in the 1970s made eating at KFC around Christmas a national custom. Its chicken meals are so popular during the season that stores take reservations months in advance.

===== History =====
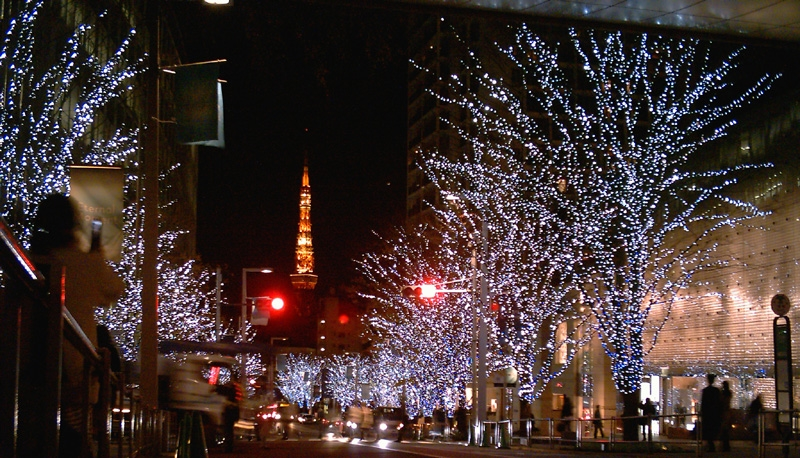
Christmas lights in Tokyo

Christianity in Japan, along with Christmas, re-emerged in the Meiji period. Influenced by America, Christmas parties were held, and presents were exchanged. The practice slowly spread, but its proximity to the New Year's celebrations makes it a smaller focus of attention. It became a popular celebration for non-Christians during the 1900s after the Russo-Japanese War.

==== South Korea ====
Christianity in Korea, celebrated on 25 December, is a public holiday in South Korea. It was designated as such in 1949, shortly after the establishment of the Republic of Korea.

For Christians, Christmas commemorates the birth of Jesus Christ, and churches hold special services on Christmas Eve and Christmas Day. It is also widely celebrated as a secular holiday, with Christmas trees, lights and decorations displayed in shopping districts and public spaces. Dining out, exchanging gifts and spending time with friends or romantic partners are common ways of celebrating.

A Christmas tree at Jogyesa in Seoul, South Korea, as part of an annual ceremony promoting interfaith harmony.

An example of interfaith observance is found at Jogyesa, the chief temple of the Jogye Order of Korean Buddhism in Seoul, which holds Christmas tree lighting ceremonies to promote religious harmony and peaceful coexistence. Buddhist monks and Christian representatives have participated in some of these events.

Unlike Seollal (Lunar New Year) and Chuseok, which are major traditional family holidays, Christmas is often associated with social outings rather than large family reunions.

==== Taiwan ====
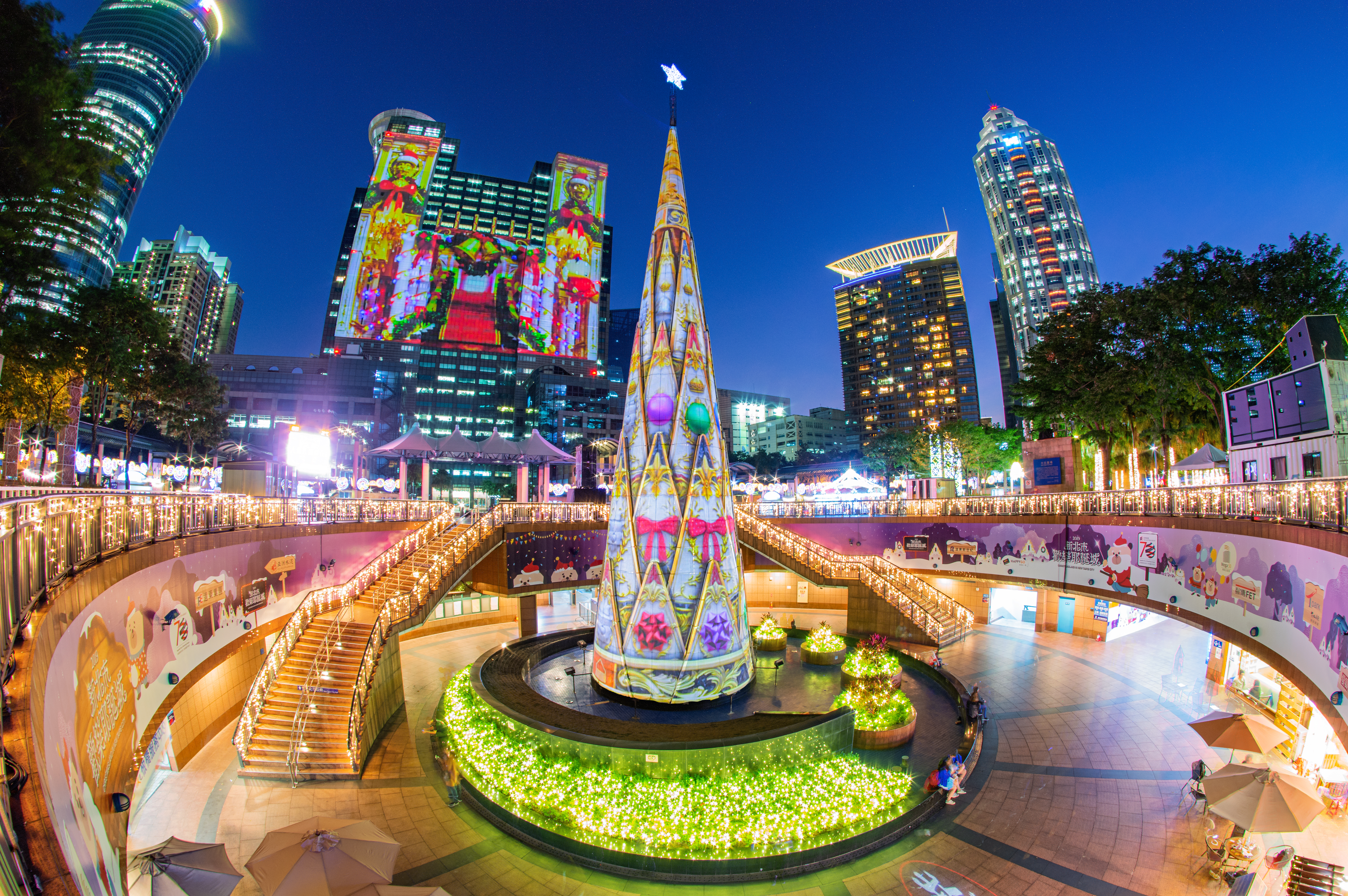
Christmasland in New Taipei City, 2019

As only around 5% of the population is actually Christian, Christmas is not usually celebrated as a religious event in Taiwan. Before 2001, 25 December used to be a national holiday, as that was the Constitution Day, the day on which the Constitution of the Republic of China was signed in 1947. In recent years, the secular celebration of Christmas has gained popularity in Taiwan. Christmas parties are held, and gifts are sometimes exchanged. Major cities and shopping malls are now decorated with Christmas lights and trees in December to celebrate the festival. One of the most popular Christmas events in Taiwan is Christmasland in New Taipei City, organized by the New Taipei City Government, consisting of major Christmas celebration activities and art installations. A series of activities, such as the family garden party, Christmas parade, carnival, and Christmas Eve concert, is often held; the program varies slightly from year to year.

=== South Asia ===
==== India ====
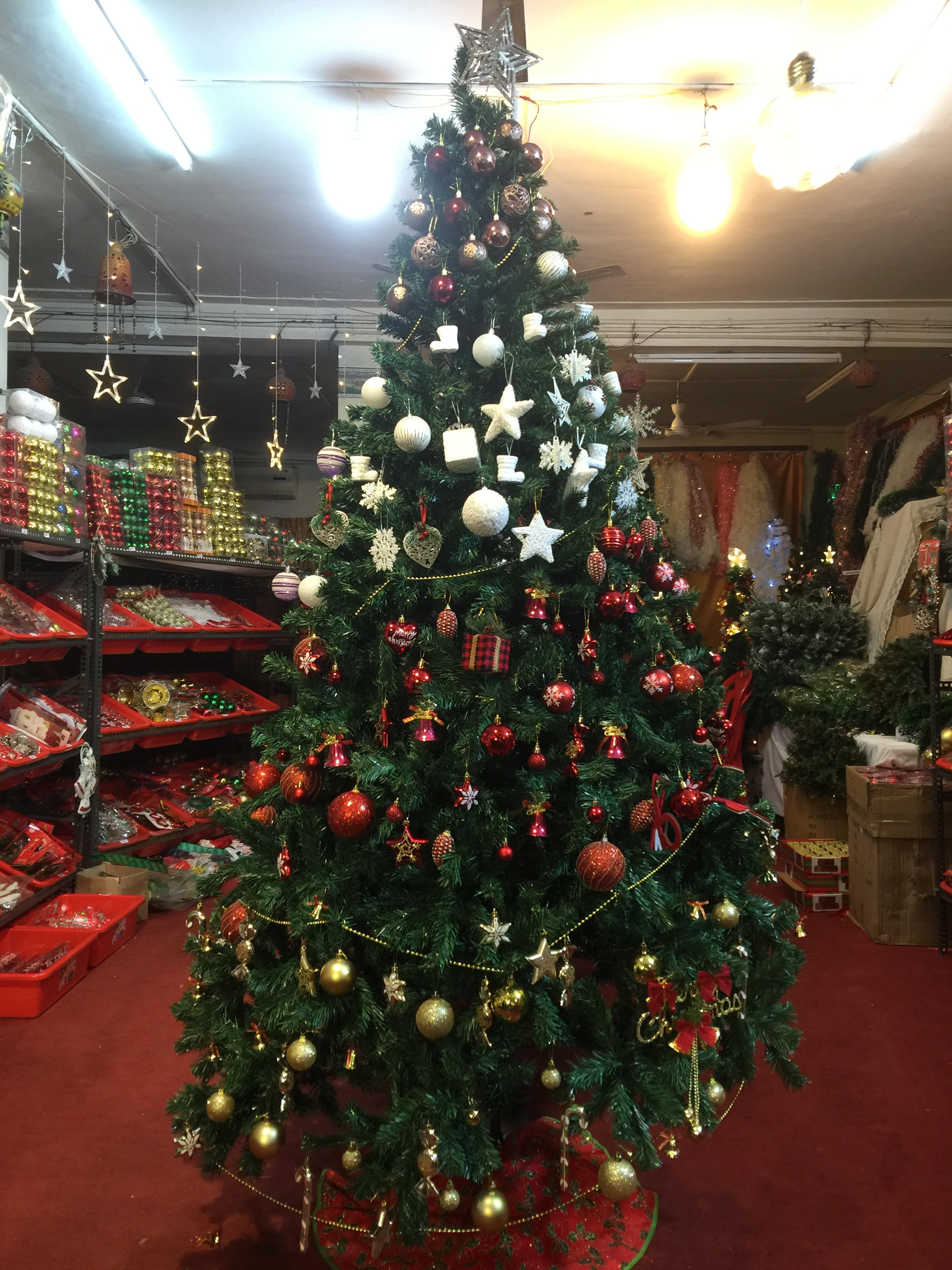
Christmas tree in India

Christmas is a state holiday in India, although Christianity in India is a minority with only 2.3% of the population. Despite most Indians being Hindus, millions of Indians still celebrate Christmas as a secular holiday.

Christians, especially Catholics, attend Midnight Mass. Many Christian houses in India decorate with Christmas cribs and Christmas trees and hang brightly lit stars (symbolising the Bethlehem star) outside their houses. They distribute sweets and cakes to their neighbors. In many schools run by Christian missionaries and in some schools run by other religious trusts (including Hinduism, Islam, etc), the children actively participate in Christmas programs. Many government schools also have a tradition of Christmas celebrations. Christmas is also increasingly celebrated by other religions in India. Christmas is known as Bada Din ('Big Day') in North and North-West India, and people plant trees on this day.

==== Pakistan ====
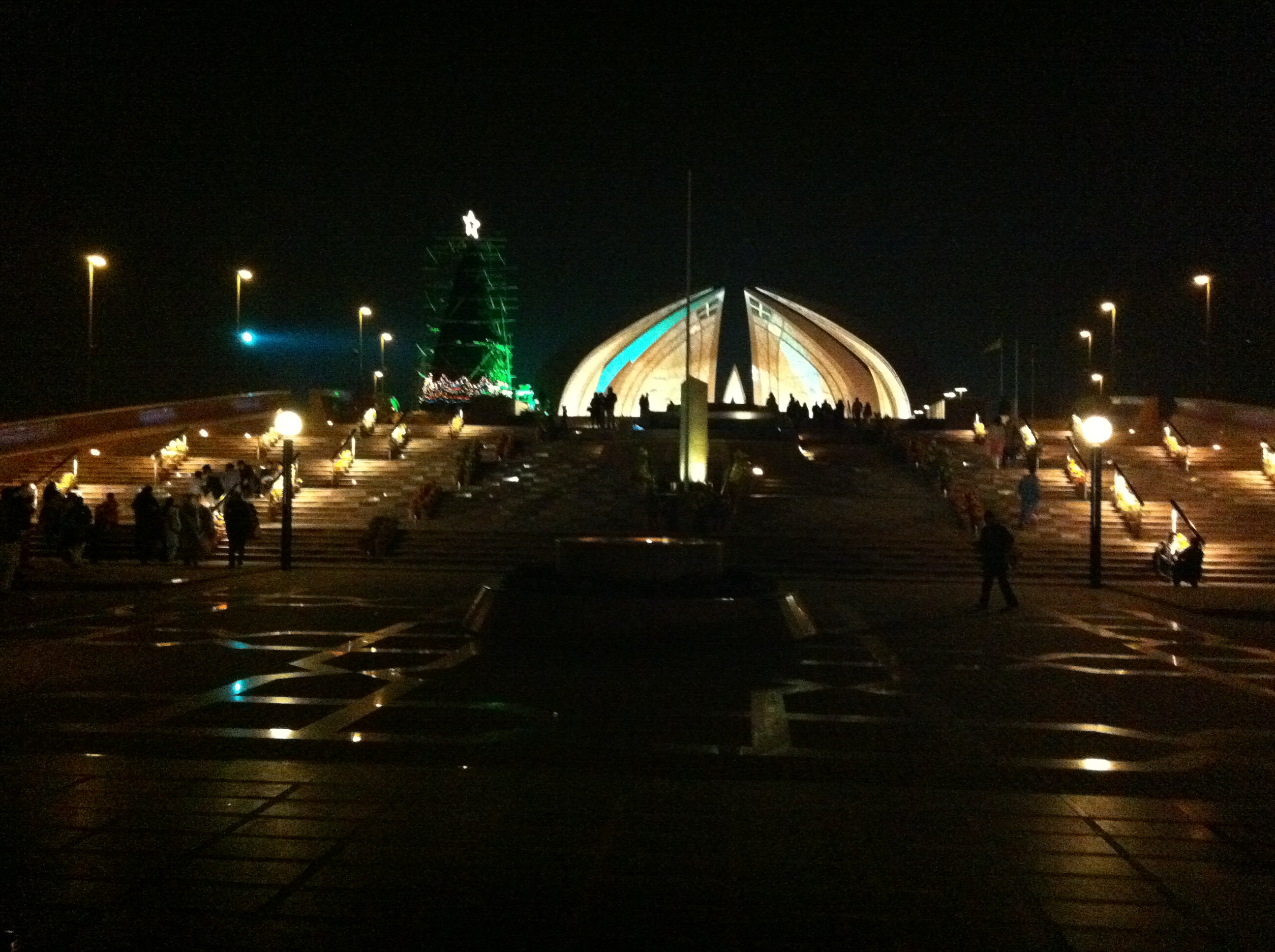
Christmas tree at Pakistan Monument

Christianity in Pakistan constitutes the second largest religious minority community in Pakistan after Hindus. The total number of Christians was approximately 2,800,000 in 2008, or 1.6% of the population. Of these, approximately half are Roman Catholic and half Protestant. Christians celebrate Christmas by going from house to house singing carols, and in return, the family offers something to the choir. The money collected from such carols is usually used for charity works or is given to the church. Homes are decorated with local Christmas handicrafts while artificial stars signifying the Star of Bethlehem are hung on rooftops. Special foods, such as the Allahabadi fruitcake, are eaten in Pakistan during the Christmas season. Christmas celebrations are also popular among the country's urban middle class, with hotels, cafes, restaurants, and theme parks hosting festive events and special occasions.

=== Southeast Asia ===
==== Brunei ====
As of 22 December 2015, Christmas is completely banned in Brunei, but its expatriate and local Christian communities still celebrate it privately amongst themselves.

==== Indonesia ====
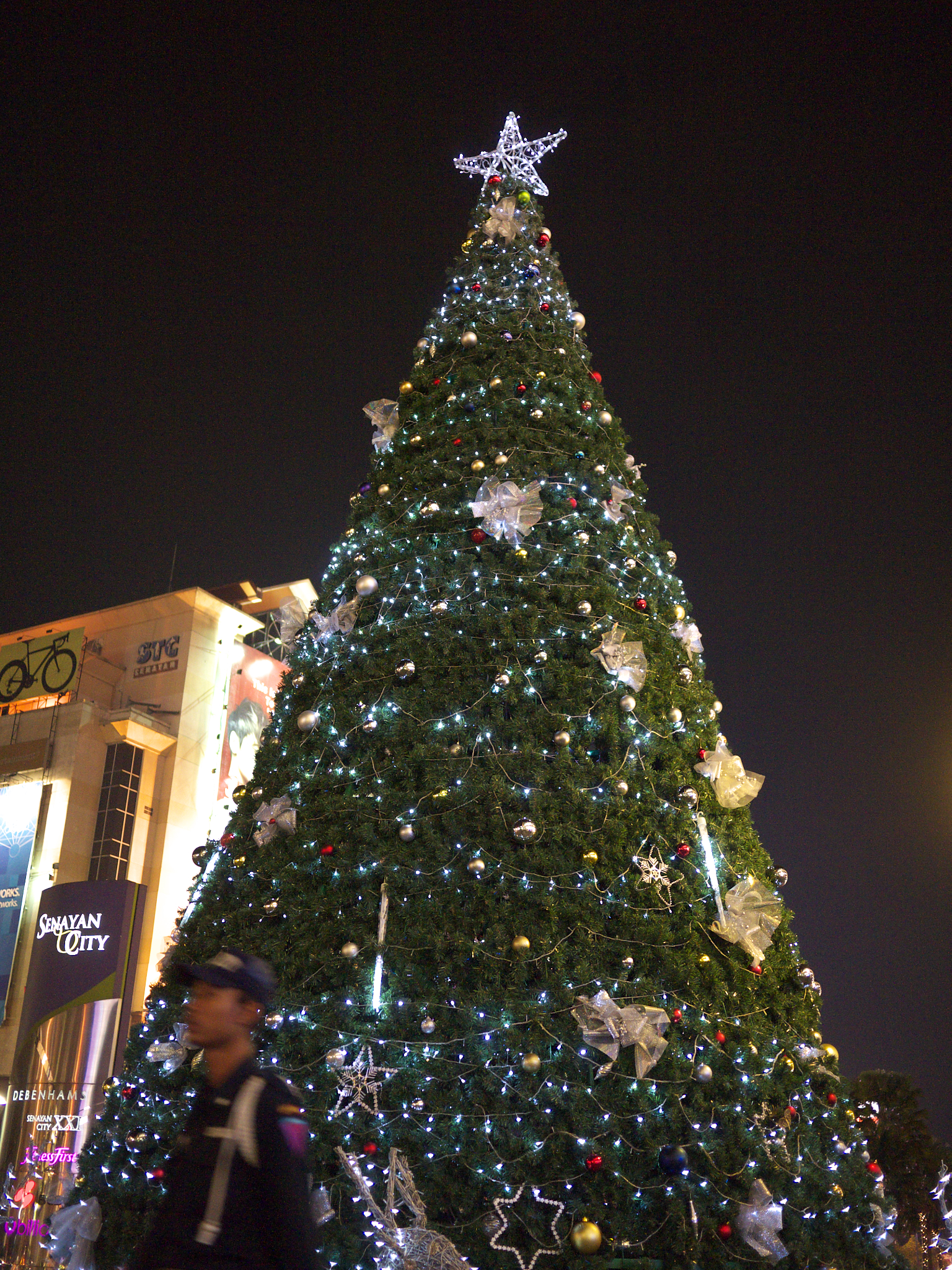
Christmas tree in Senayan City, Jakarta, Indonesia

Christmas in Indonesia (locally known as Natal, from the Portuguese word for 'Christmas'), is one of many public holidays in Indonesia, which approximately 16.5 million Protestants and 6.9 million Roman Catholics celebrate with various traditions throughout the country. In provinces with a majority or significant Christian population (Protestant and Catholic) such as North Sumatra, Jakarta, West Kalimantan, Central Kalimantan, North Kalimantan, North Sulawesi, West Sulawesi, Central Sulawesi, East Nusa Tenggara, Maluku, the whole Papua Island, and cities like Surabaya, Tangerang, Batam, Bandung, Rantepao, etc., the Christmas season is filled with ceremonies, festivals, and local foods. In big cities, many shopping centres, offices, some roads, and other commercial places feature decorations such as plastic Christmas trees and Sinterklas (derived from the Dutch word Sinterklaas) and his reindeer. Most local television channels broadcast Christmas musical concerts as well as annual national Christmas celebrations, such as government-hosted concerts and Christmas shows. As in other countries, on Christmas Eve people go to church for misa and attend the next morning again. Exchanging gifts is a usual tradition for Christians in Indonesia. In addition to traditional foods, Christmas Day generally features cookies, like nastar (pineapple tart), kastengel (from Dutch kasteengel), or putri salju.

==== Malaysia ====
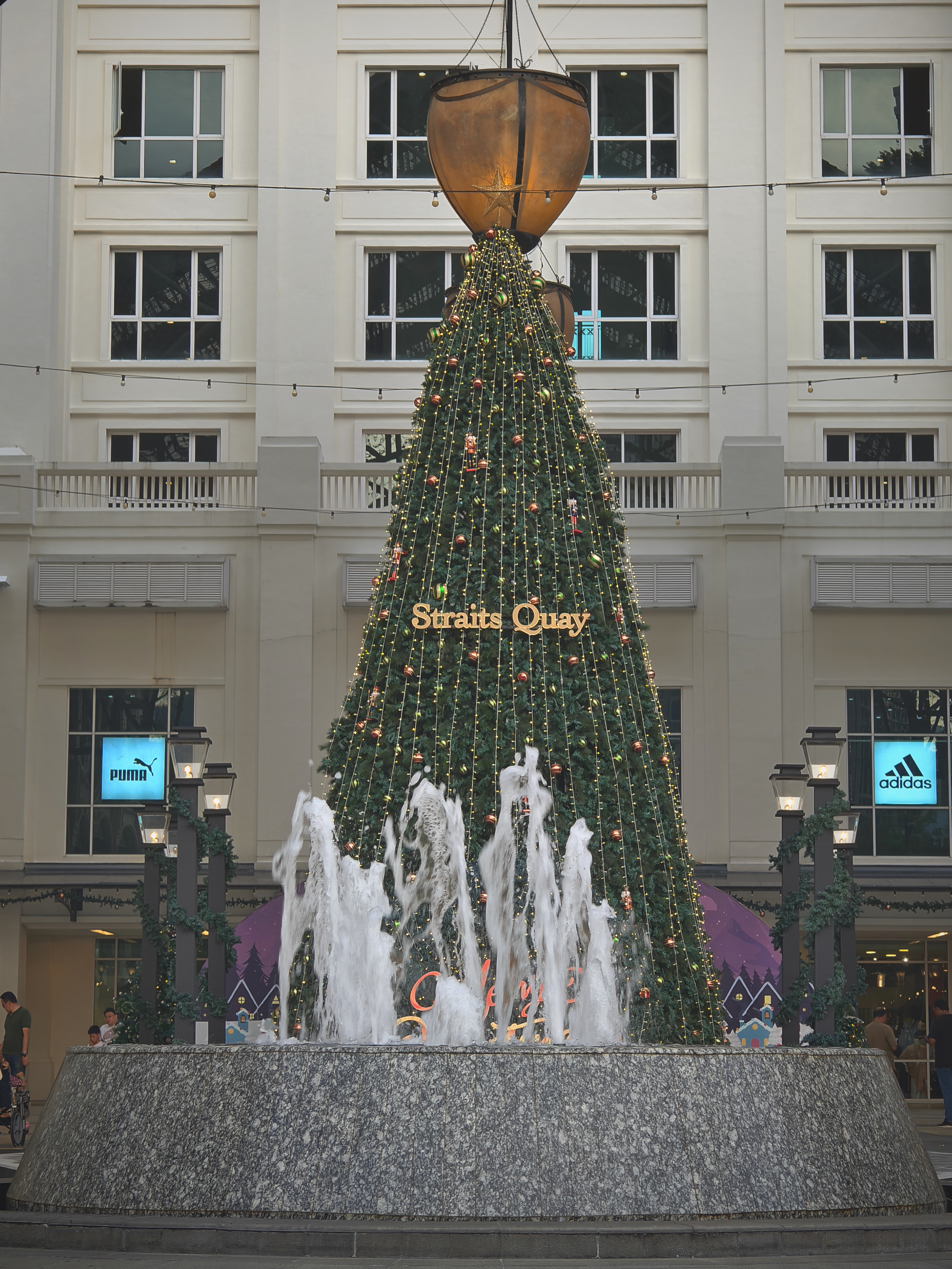
Christmas decorations at Straits Quay in George Town, Penang

Although Christmas is a public holiday in Malaysia, much of the public celebration is commercial in nature and has no overt religious overtones. Occasionally, Christian activist groups buy newspaper advertisements on Christmas, but this is allowed only in English newspapers, and permission is not granted every year. The advertisements themselves are usually indirect statements. There has been controversy over whether or not the federal government has exerted pressure on Malaysian Christians not to use Christian religious symbols and hymns that specifically mention Jesus Christ.

In East Malaysia, which covers northern Borneo, Christmas is a huge celebration due to the large number of indigenous people who practice Christianity.

Celebrations in Christian majority districts in the states of Sabah and Sarawak can last until after New Year's Day, with families and political leaders hosting Open Houses, namely parties which are open to anyone.

Drinking alcohol is widespread during this period, and a call by a Muslim political party to ban alcohol was met with widespread outrage.

==== Philippines ====
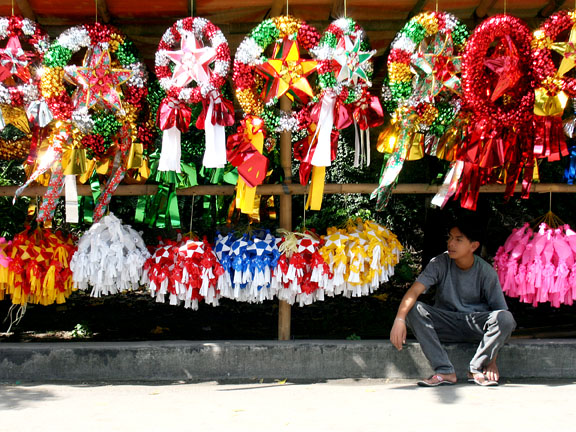
Parols are an iconic display in the Philippines during its long Christmas season.

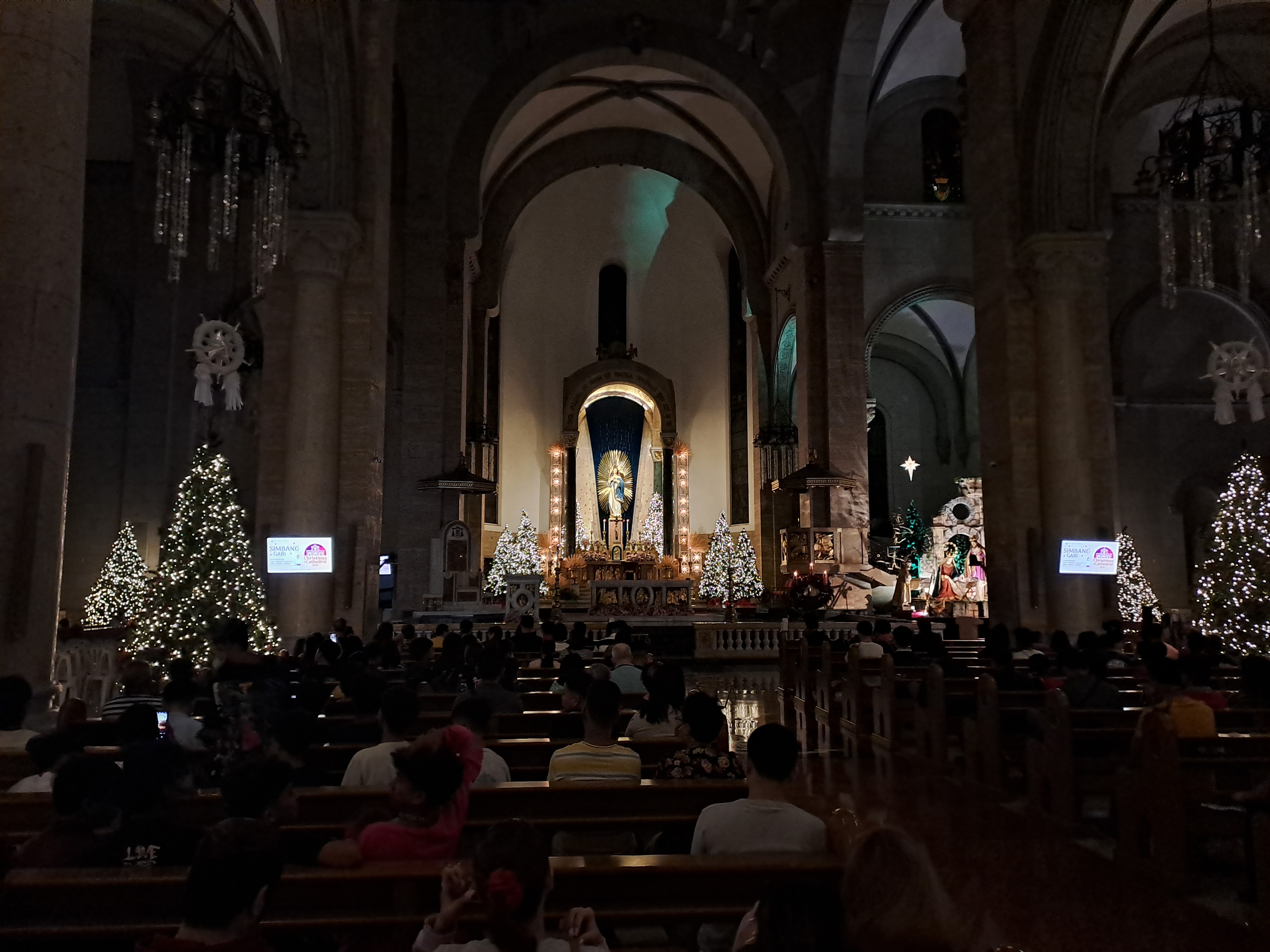
Simbang Gabi or known as Spanish tradition Misa de Gallo gathering in Manila Cathedral

Christmas in the Philippines—one of two predominantly Catholic countries in Asia alongside East Timor—is one of the biggest and most widely celebrated holidays on the calendar. The country has earned the distinction of celebrating the world's longest Christmas season, with carols heard as early as 1 September when the traditional "Ber Months" kick off.

Similar to many East Asian countries, secular Christmas displays are common in both business establishments and public spaces. These include lights, Christmas trees, depictions of Santa Claus (despite the tropical climate), and festive greetings in various Philippine and foreign languages. Occasionally, these decorations remain in place even into the summer. A prominent example is the parol, a star-shaped lantern representing the "Star of Bethlehem" that led the Three Kings to the newborn Baby Jesus.

The spiritual season is officially ushered in by a nine-day series of dawn Masses starting on 16 December. Known as Misas de Aguinaldo ('Gift Masses') or Misa de Gallo ('Rooster's Mass') in traditional Spanish, they are more popularly called Simbang Gabi in Tagalog and are held in Catholic parishes and chapels nationwide. Because of the season's importance, several dates in close proximity to the existing legal holidays of Rizal Day (30 December) and New Year's Eve (31 December) are often declared non-working days. These typically include Christmas Eve (24 December), Niños Inocentes (28 December), and the Epiphany.

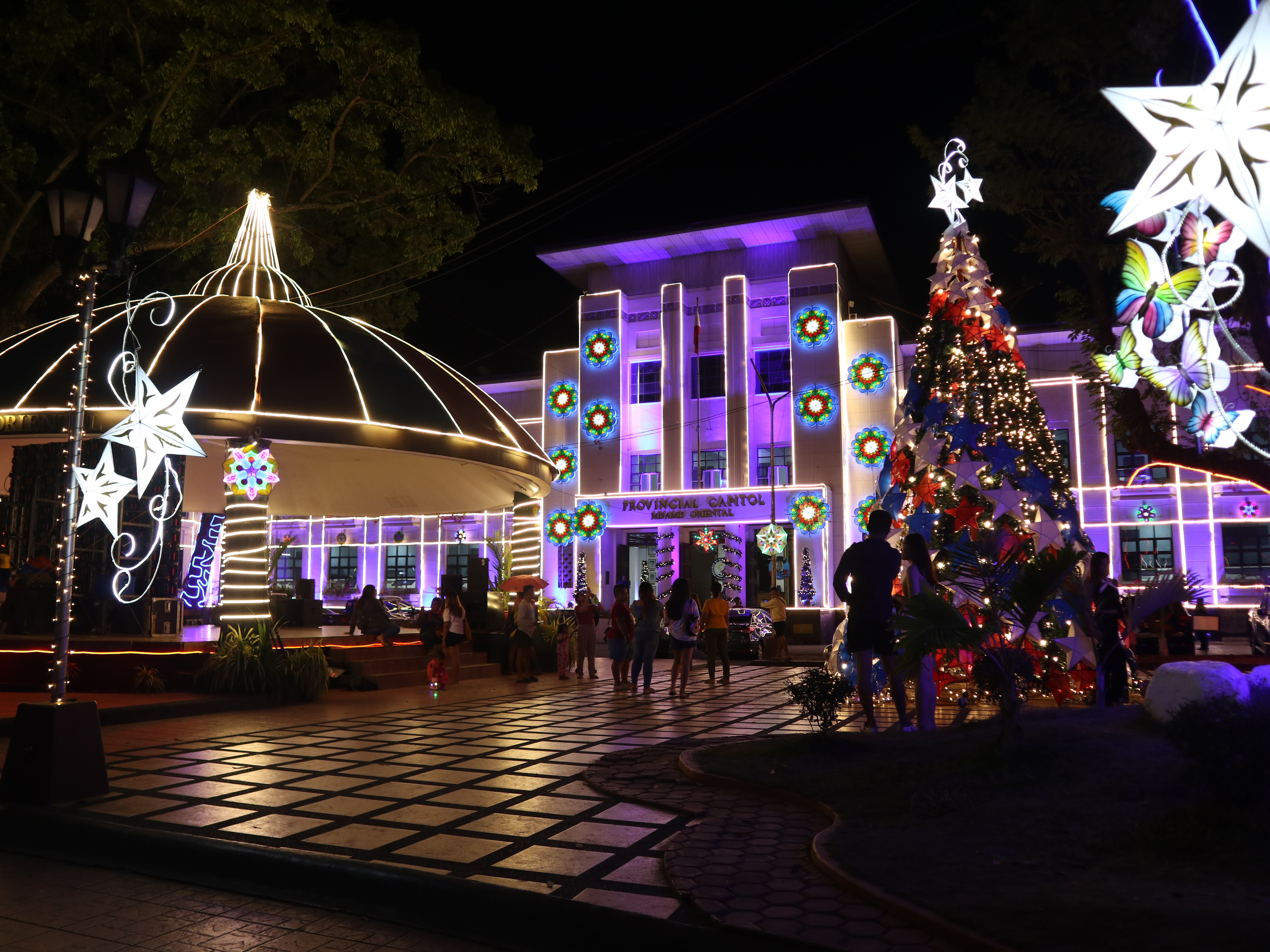
Illuminating lights around Misamis Oriental Capitol Hall, Cagayan de Oro City

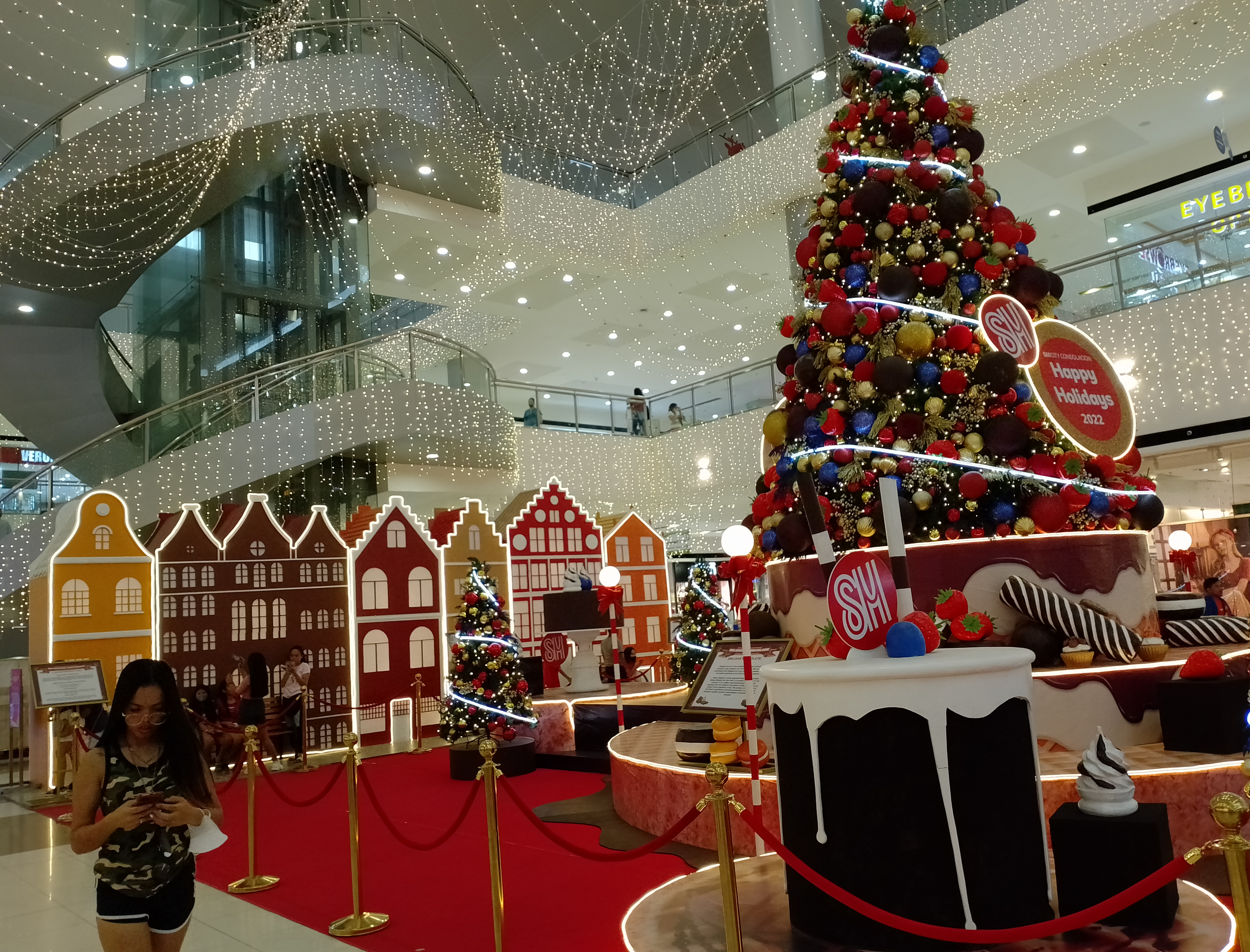
Decorated Christmas mall in Cebu

The holiday season officially culminates on the Feast of the Three Kings (Tres Reyes in Spanish or Tatlong Hari in Tagalog), also known as the Feast of the Epiphany (Fiesta de Epifanía). Traditionally commemorated on 6 January, it is now celebrated on the first Sunday after the New Year. Some children leave their shoes out by the window, believing the Three Kings will leave gifts of candy or money inside. However, the festivities often extend even further. Since 2011, the Catholic Church has mandated that the season concludes on the second Sunday of January or even Monday after Epiphany, honoring the Solemnity of the Lord's Baptism (Solemnidad de Bautismo del Señor). The final salvo of these celebrations is marked by the Feast of the Black Nazarene on 9 January in Manila and Cagayan de Oro, though in some regions, the festive spirit extends into the final weeks of January due to celebrations honoring the Santo Niño on the third and fourth Sundays of the month.

==== Singapore ====
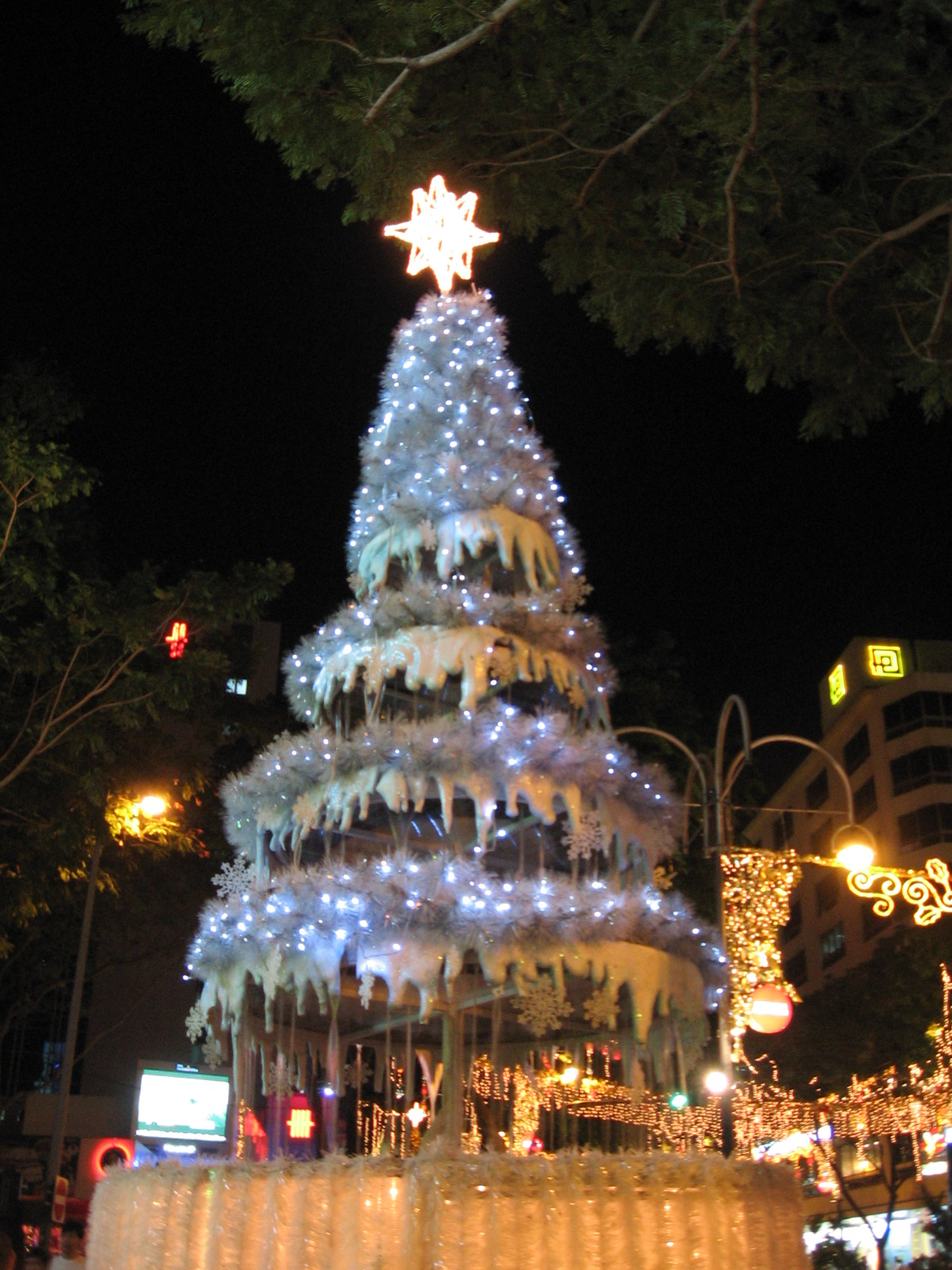
Christmas in Singapore

Christmas is a public holiday in Singapore that is widely celebrated.

==== Vietnam ====
Christmas is not a national holiday, but is becoming increasingly popular in Vietnam due to increasing exposure to Western culture and its non-religious glamour and commercial appeal. Vietnamese may be more accepting of corporate influence because for many, Christmas was never based on personal values to begin with. It is not a time to have dinner at home with family and show thanks for one another. Instead, it is a time to go out on the town, shop, and take pictures with friends in front of colorful displays, especially on 24 December.

Many Vietnamese Catholic churches put up a nativity scene; in contrast to Western nativity scenes, the scene is set in a cave instead of a stable. Catholic homes and businesses are also decorated with these nativity caves.

Christmas is reported to be banned in Vietnam's Central Highlands, and in some cases observers have reported harassment by authorities including accusations of "attempting to overthrow" the regime.

=== West Asia ===
==== Armenia ====
Armenians usually celebrate Christmas on 6 January. The reason for this unusual date dates back to ancient history. "In the fourth century Roman Catholic Church, officials established the date of Christmas as December 25th." Before that time, Armenians celebrated Christmas (surb tsnunt, Սուրբ Ծնունդ, meaning 'Holy Birth') on 6 January as a public holiday in Armenia. It also coincides with the Epiphany. The Armenians denied the new Roman mandate regarding Christmas and continued to celebrate both the Nativity and Jesus' baptism on 6 January. When the Gregorian calendar was implemented in 1582, the Armenians rejected the reformed calendar and continued to follow the Julian Calendar. Today, only the Armenian Patriarchate of Jerusalem still uses the Julian Calendar. Since the Julian calendar is thirteen days behind the Gregorian calendar, when the Armenians of Jerusalem celebrate Christmas on 6 January according to the Julian calendar, the Gregorian calendar counts the day as 19 January.

Traditionally, Armenians fast during the week leading up to Christmas, avoiding all meat, eggs, and dairy products. Devout Armenians may even refrain from eating for the three days leading up to Christmas Eve to receive the Eucharist on a "pure" stomach. Christmas Eve is particularly rich in traditions. Families gather for the Christmas Eve dinner (khetum, Խթում), which generally consists of rice, fish, nevik (նուիկ, a vegetable dish of green chard and chick peas), and yogurt/wheat soup (tanabur, թանապուր). Dessert includes dried fruits and nuts, including rojik, which consists of whole shelled walnuts threaded on a string and encased in grape jelly, bastukh (a paper-like confection of grape jelly, corn-starch, and flour), etc. This lighter menu is designed to ease the stomach off the week-long fast and prepare it for the rather more substantial Christmas Day dinner. Children take presents of fruits, nuts, and other candies to older relatives. "On the eve of the Feast of the Nativity and Theophany of The Lord Jesus Christ, the Jrakalouyts Divine Liturgy (the lighting of the lamps service) is celebrated in honor of the manifestation of Jesus as the Son of God (theophany)".

==== Assyrians ====
Traditional ceremony during an Assyrian Christmas celebration in Alqosh, northern Iraq

The Assyrians, the indigenous people of northwestern Iran, northern Iraq, northeastern Syria, and southeastern Turkey that belong to the Assyrian Church of the East, Ancient Church of the East, Syriac Orthodox Church, and Chaldean Catholic Church today celebrate Christmas on 25 December. Assyrians colloquially call Christmas Eda Zora, meaning 'little holiday.' It is officially called Eda d'Yalde, which means 'birthday holiday.' Traditionally, Assyrians fast (sawma) from 1 December until Christmas Day. In Iraq, for instance, on Christmas Eve, Assyrian families gather outside their homes and hold lit candles while a child reads the nativity story aloud. Then they all sing psalms over a bonfire made of thorn bushes. Folklore says that if the thorns burn to ashes, the family will have good luck. After the fire has been reduced to ashes, the family members will jump three times over the ashes and make a wish. The next day, on Christmas, "as another bonfire burns in the churchyard, the bishops lead the service while carrying a figure of the baby Jesus. He blesses one person with a touch. That person touches the next person and the touch passes around until all have felt the touch of peace." Many Assyrians will attend the Shaharta, or midnight vigil before Christmas. On Christmas Day, when families gather together after the Shaharta or morning mass, raza d'mowlada d'maran, the fast is broken by eating traditional Assyrian foods such as pacha/reesh-aqle (meaning 'from the head to the tail'), which is a boiled soup made of sheep or cow intestines, tongue, stomach, legs, and spices or harissa, a porridge made of ground wheat and chicken (both dishes are prepared usually overnight). These two dishes are only made twice a year: on Christmas and Easter. Traditional desserts eaten after the main course include killeche, a date-and-nut-stuffed cookie, and kadeh, another stuffed pastry. After the feast is over, Assyrians will visit the homes of family and friends to exchange Christmas greetings, saying, "Eedokhon breekha", meaning "May your feast be blessed."

==== Lebanon ====
Christmas is an official holiday in Lebanon. The Lebanese celebrate Christmas on 25 December, except for Armenian Lebanese Christians who celebrate Christmas on 6 January (also an official holiday in Lebanon). Lebanese families gather to butcher a sheep for a Christmas Eve feast in honor of the birth of "the shepherd" Jesus Christ. On that night, the head of the house passes around a piece of coal representing the sins before Christ. After the piece of coal has been passed around, it is then set on fire. After Dinner, Lebanese Christians attend midnight mass. Santa Claus is known in French as Papa Noël. Gifts are either dropped off at church or Papa Noël makes a personal appearance at the home.

==== Jordan ====
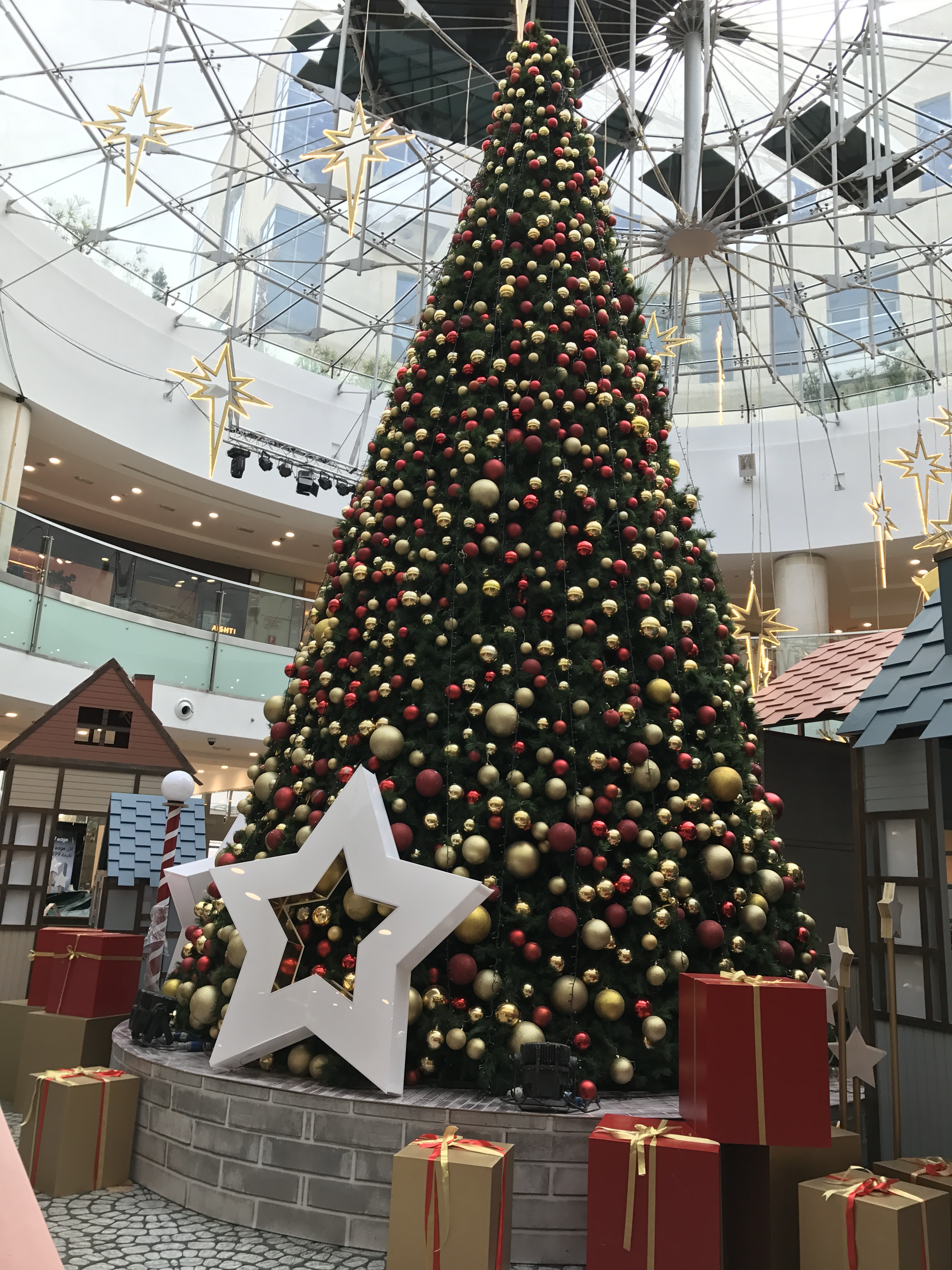
A Christmas tree inside a shopping mall in Amman, Jordan

Jordanian Christians observe Christmas on 25 December, which is a national holiday. The Muslim majority of Jordan also take part in Christmas as a holiday, and during this time shops and streets in Jordan are colorfully decorated.

==== Iraq ====
Christmas is celebrated by Christians in Iraq, and in 2018, it was declared an official state holiday for the first time. In recent years, an increasing number of Muslims have also started celebrating Christmas as a secular holiday.

==== Palestine ====
The main focus of the holiday's celebrations is in Bethlehem in the Palestinian-controlled West Bank, just kilometers from Jerusalem, where the Church of the Nativity is located. It is celebrated thrice there:

- 24 and 25 December by Catholics (Latins), who use the General Roman Calendar (Gregorian), and many Protestants;
- 6 and 7 January by the Greek Orthodox, together with the Syriac Orthodox, Ethiopian, and Coptic Orthodox, who use the Julian calendar;
- 18 and 19 January by the Armenian Apostolic Church, which combines the celebration of the Nativity with that of the Baptism of Jesus into the Armenian Feast of Theophany on 6 January, according to the early traditions of Eastern Christianity, but follows the rules of the Armenian Patriarchate of Jerusalem in its calculations (6 January Julian style corresponds to 19 January Gregorian style).

==== Saudi Arabia ====
Christmas is not an official holiday in Saudi Arabia. Until around the early 2010s, Christmas was banned in Saudi Arabia, as it is and still is considered haram by Islamic authorities. Decorations can be found in certain indoor markets and malls.

==== Syria ====
Most Christians in Syria celebrate Christmas on 25 December, although Armenians generally celebrate on 6 January and some other Orthodox Christians on 7 January. Christmas has been a public holiday in Syria since 1963. In 2024, the new Syrian Government declared 26 December a holiday to celebrate Christmas.

== Europe ==
=== Central Europe ===
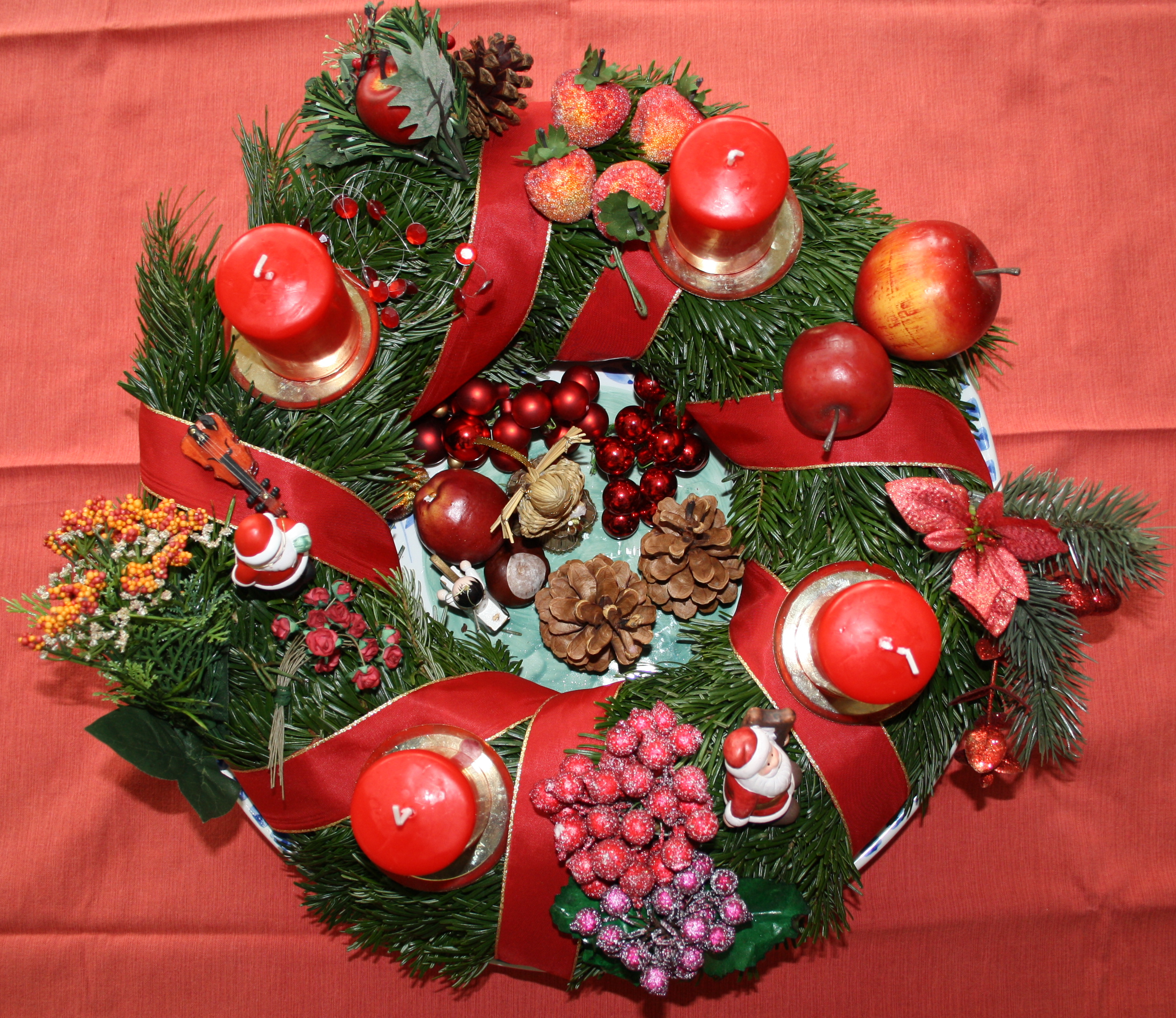
Christmas wreath

In many areas of Central Europe, Saint Nicholas (Hungarian: Mikulás, Czech: Mikuláš, Polish: Mikołaj, Slovak: Mikuláš, Slovene: Miklavž, Ukrainian: Миколай), or Santa Claus, does not come for Christmas. He visits families earlier, on the dawn of Saint Nicholas Day on 6 December. For the well-behaved children, he has presents and candy bags to put into their well-polished shoes that were set in the windows the previous evening. He neither parks his sleigh on rooftops nor climbs chimneys, and his visits are usually accompanied by a diabolic-looking servant named Krampusz (in Austria, Slovenia, and Croatia, Krampus; in Czech and Slovak regions he is simply čert, i.e., 'devil', without any name) who gives golden coloured birches for so-called badly behaved children. All children receive both gifts and golden birches (Hungarian: virgács) in their shoes, regardless of their behavior.

==== Austria and Germany ====
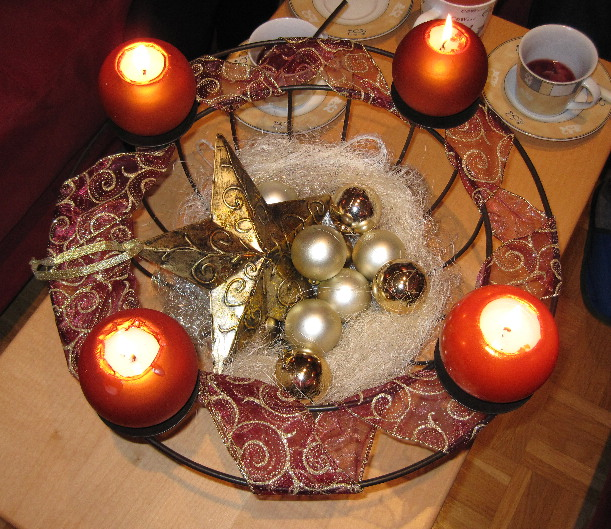
Austrian Advent bowl

In some German-speaking communities, particularly in Catholic regions of western and southern Germany, Switzerland, Austria, South Tyrol and Liechtenstein, as well as in other Catholic regions of Central Europe, the Christkind (literally 'Christ child') brings the presents on the evening of 24 December ('Holy Evening' or Heiliger Abend).

===== Austria =====
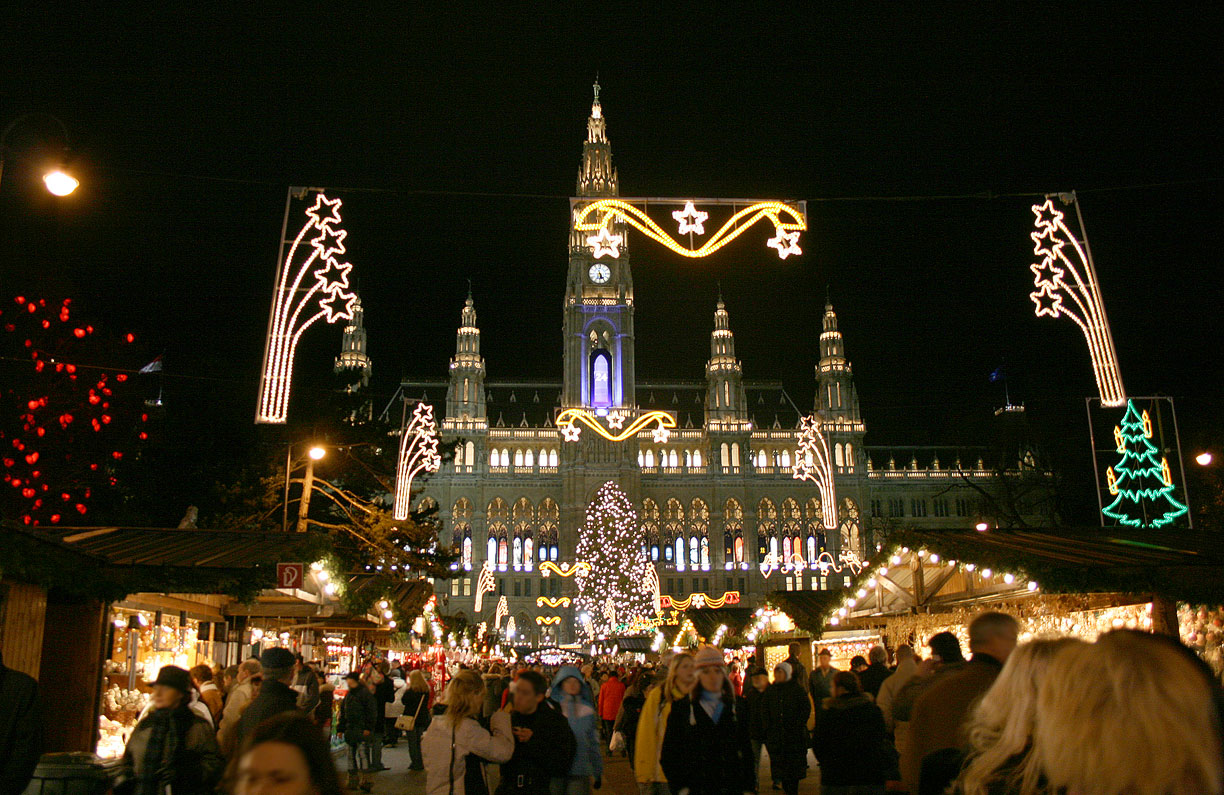
Christmas market in front of the town hall in Vienna, Austria

In Austria, Christmas trees play a very important part in Christmas celebrations. Every town sets up its own huge tree on the main square, all decorated with electric candles, ornaments, and various decorations resembling candies or other sweets, and frequently, there will be an extra one, adorned with breadcrumbs, for the birds. In families, the tree is decorated with gold and silver ornaments or stars made out of straw, sweets, and candy wrapped in tinfoil, gilded nuts, etc.

The feast of St Nicholas marks the beginning of Christmas in Austria. On Christmas Eve (24 December), the tree is lit for the first time and the whole family gathers to sing Christmas carols like "Stille Nacht, heilige Nacht" ("Silent Night").

===== Germany =====
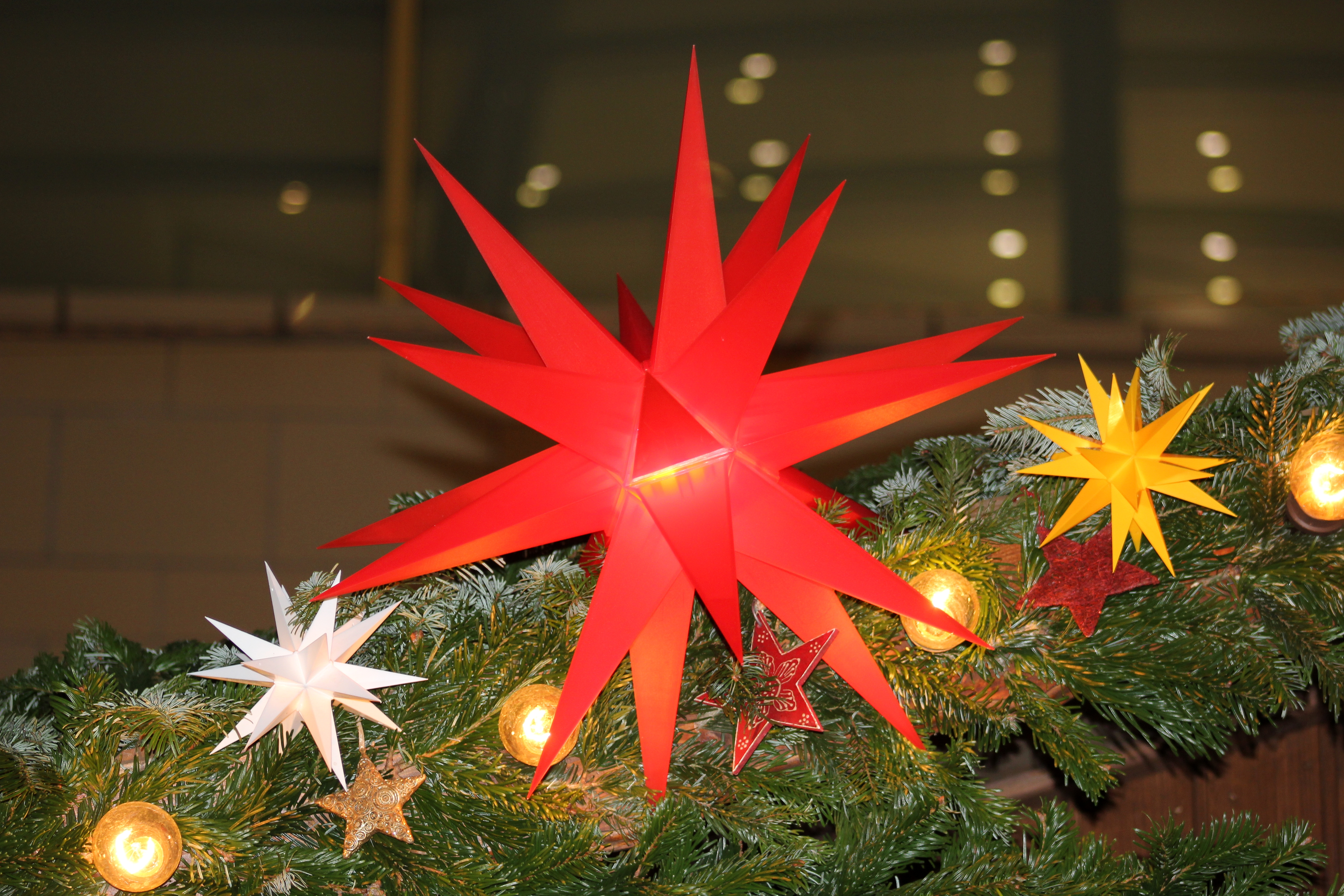
Christmas star

Old Bavarian crib found in St Mang Basilica, Füssen, Bavaria

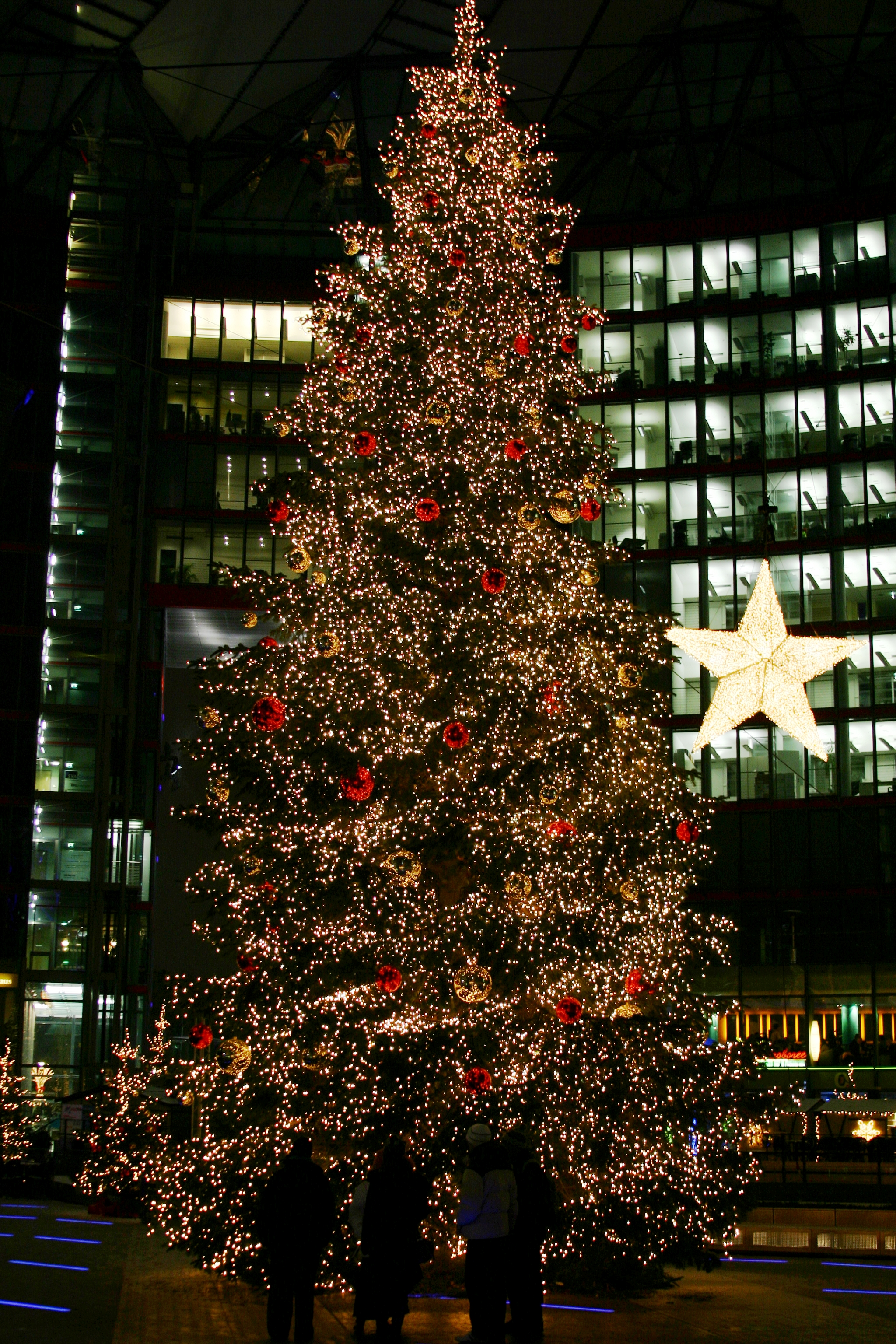
Christmas tree in Berlin, Germany

The Sorbs, a minority in Saxony and parts of Brandenburg who speak a language similar to Polish, have specific traditions. In Jänschwalde, the Bescherkind or Janšojski bog ('gift child'), a girl dressed in local costume and veil, visits the neighbors and goes around with two companions on the Wednesday before Christmas. As with Saint Nicholas, smaller presents like sweets are given, and blessings are offered, but she remains silent.

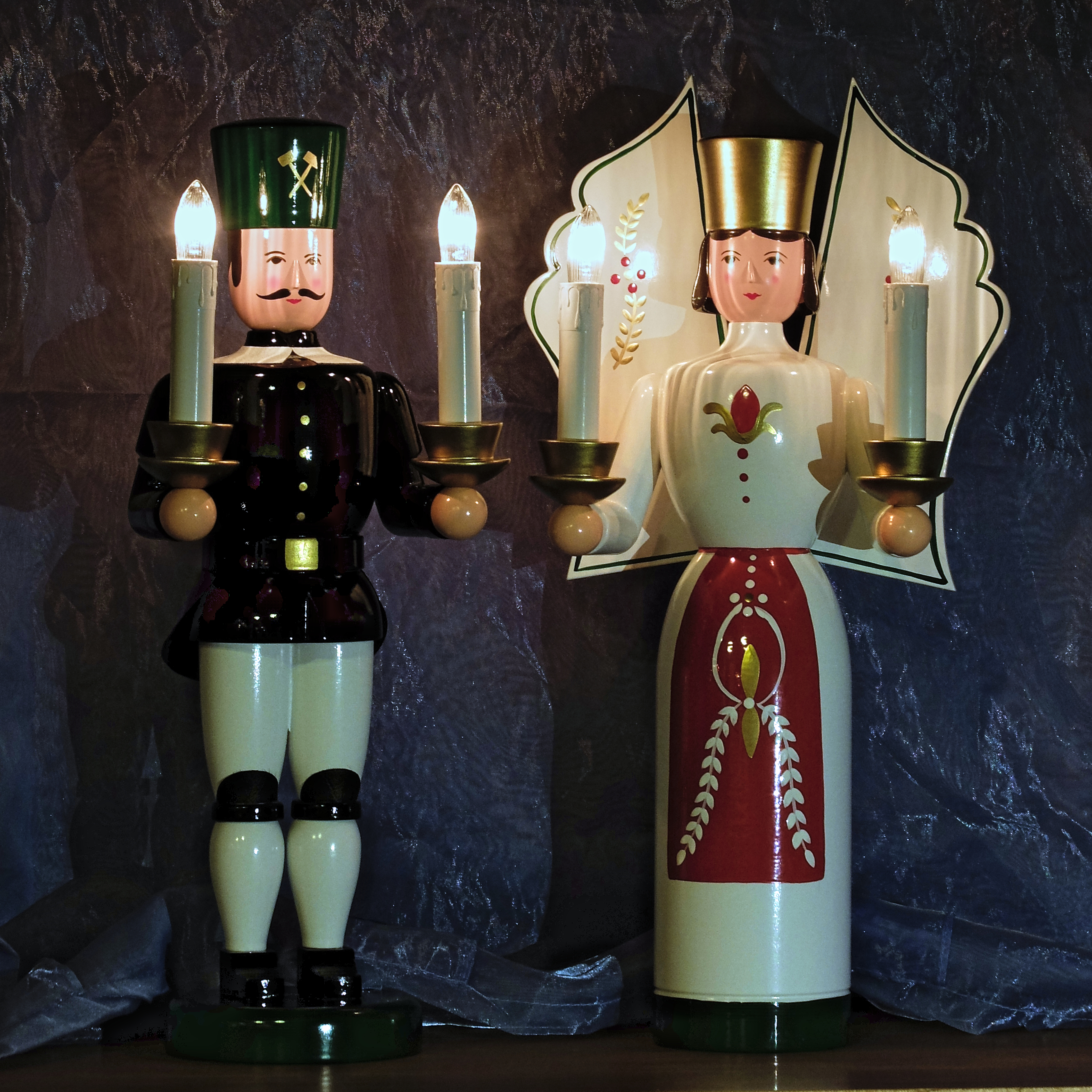
Traditional Miner's figures as Christmas light bearers

Currently, the actual Christmas gift-giving (German: Bescherung) usually takes place on Christmas Eve. This tradition was introduced by Reformer Martin Luther, who believed that one should emphasize Christ's birth rather than a saint's day, and do away with the notion that gifts must be earned through good behavior. The gifts should be seen as a symbol of God's grace in Christ.

The culinary feast either takes place at supper on Christmas Eve or on the first day of Christmas. Traditions vary from region to region; carp is eaten in many parts of the country.

==== Czech Republic and Slovakia ====
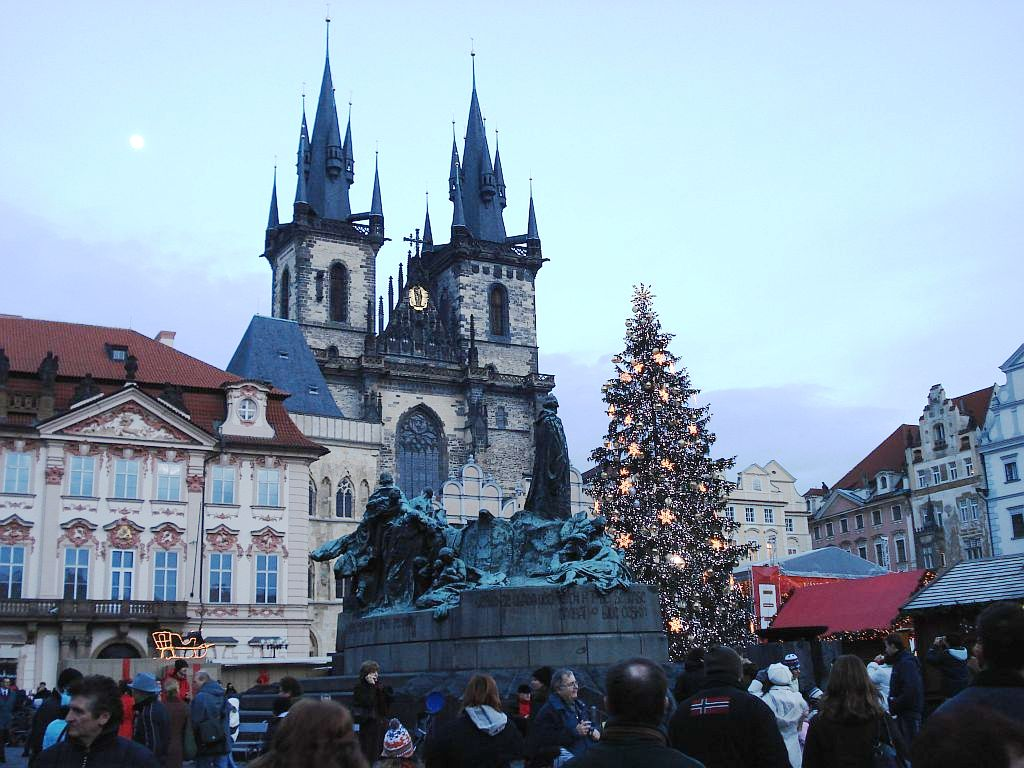
Old Town Square in Prague, Czech Republic – Christmastime

In Catholic Slovakia, the tradition of Jasličkári involves young men dressed as shepherds or angels visiting their neighbors and presenting recitations and songs about the birth of Jesus.

==== Hungary ====
Although the role of gift-giver on Christmas Day itself is assigned to the Christ Child, on the night before Saint Nicholas Day, Hungarian children traditionally place a boot on their windowsill waiting for Mikulás to come by and fill it with treats.

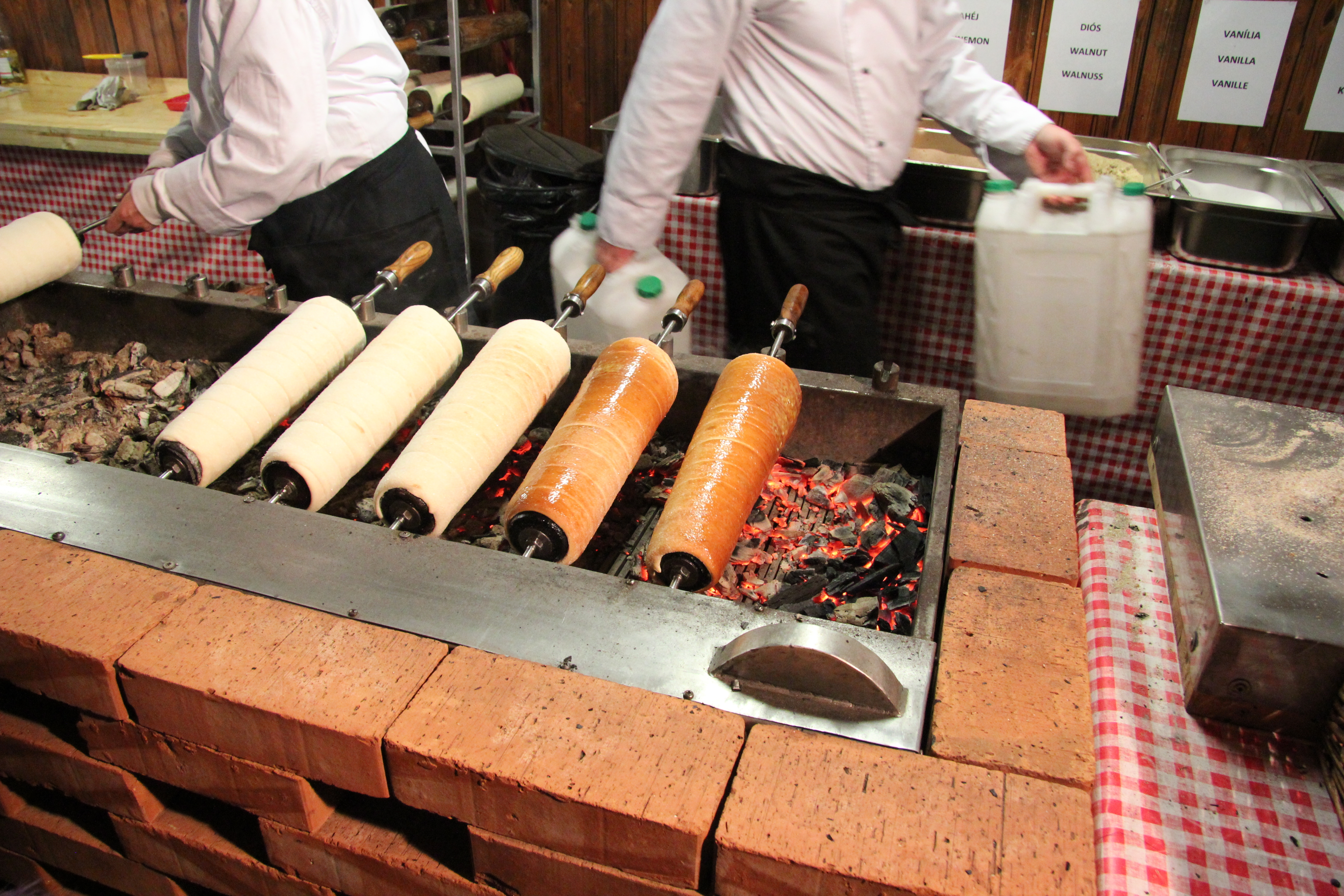
Kürtőskalács in Budapest

==== Poland ====
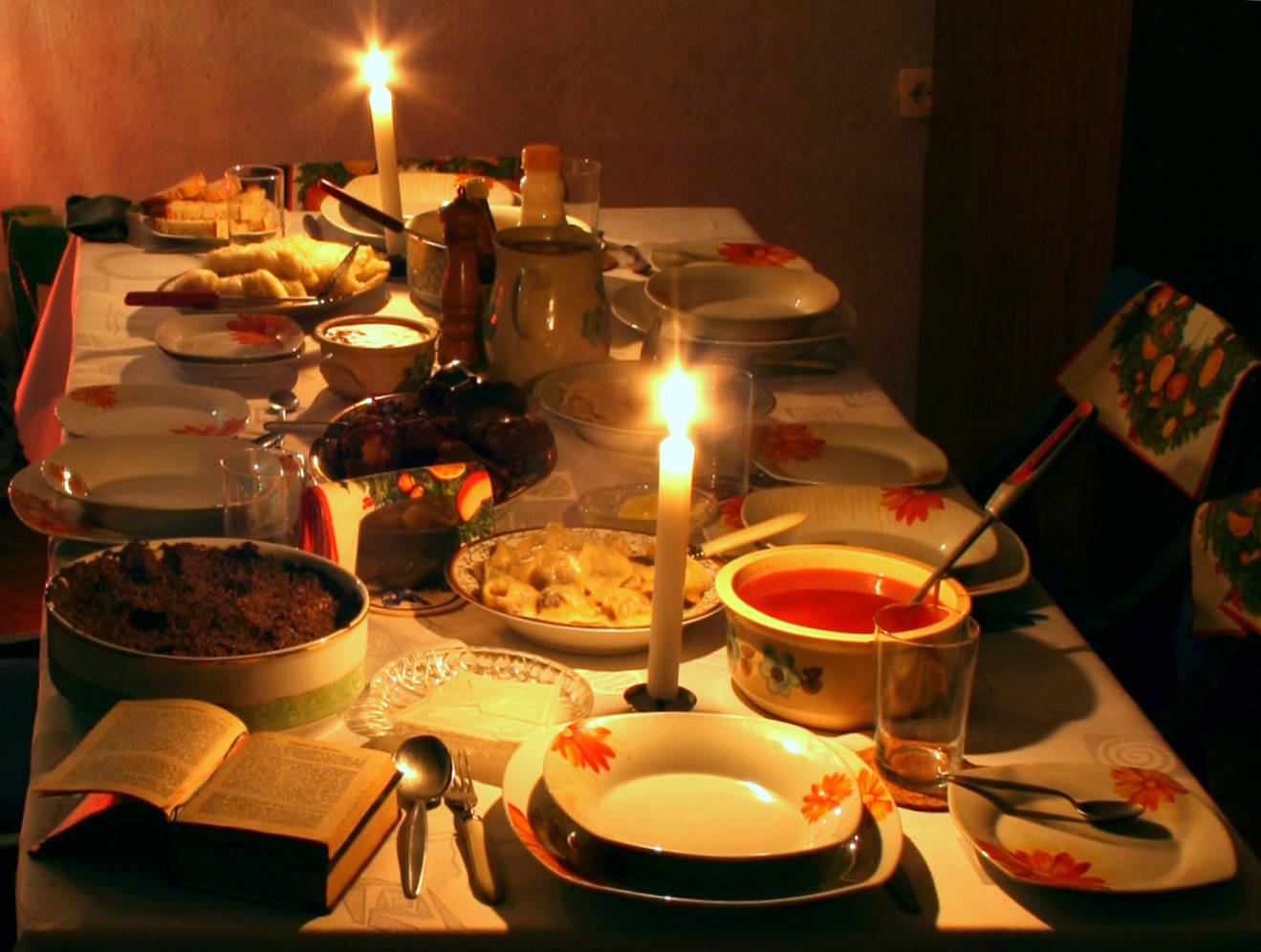
Traditional Polish Wigilia meal

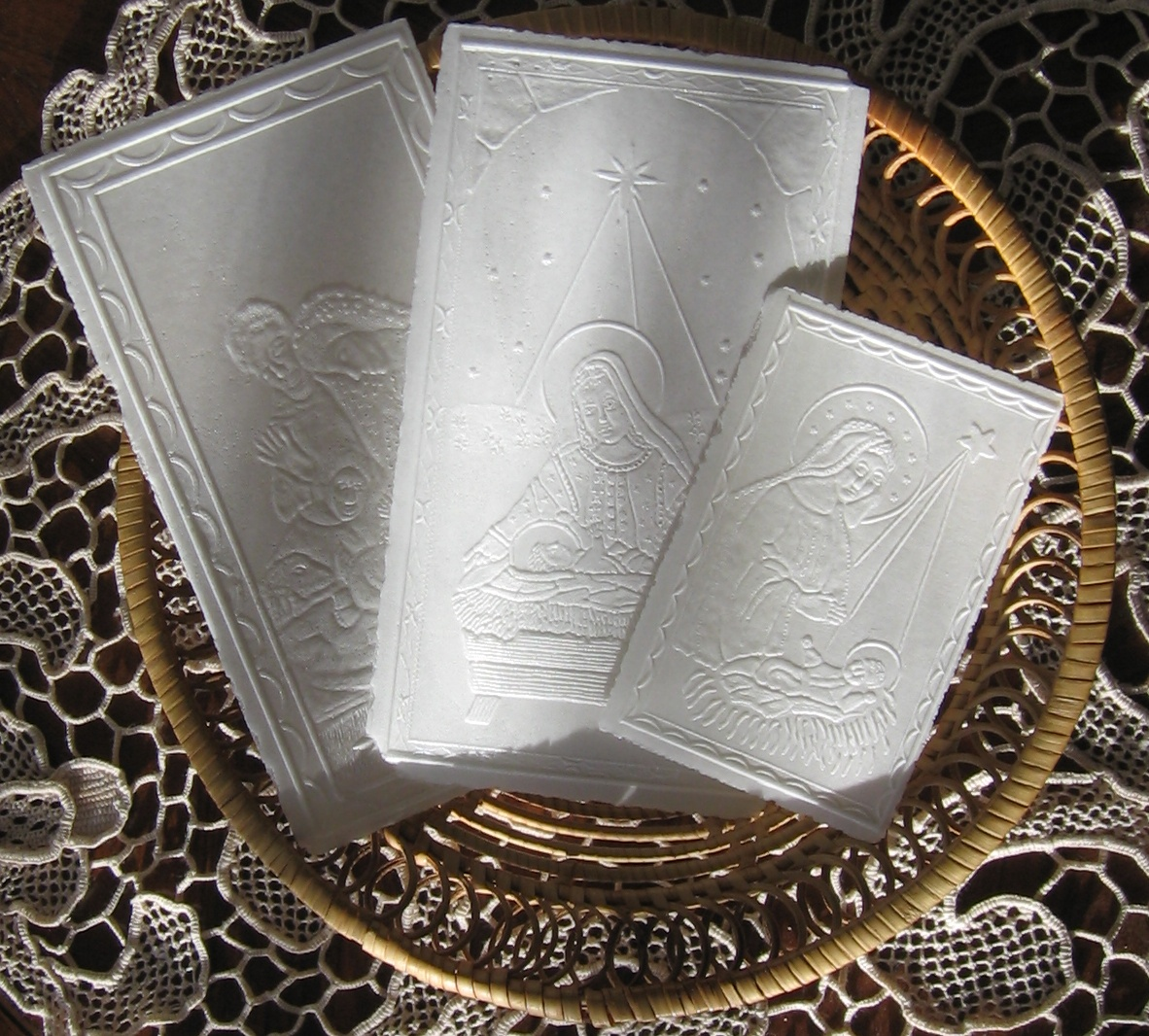
Polish opłatki (Christmas wafer) in a basket

In largely Catholic Poland, Christmas Eve begins with a day of fasting, followed by a night of feasting. The traditional Christmas meal is known as Wigilia ('The Vigil'), and being invited to attend a Wigilia dinner with a family is considered a high honor. On the night of Christmas Eve, the appearance of the first star in the sky is watched for, in remembrance of the Star of Bethlehem; it has been given the affectionate name of "the little star" or Gwiazdka (the female counterpart of Saint Nicholas). On that evening, children watch the sky anxiously, hoping to be the first to cry out, "The star has come!" After the appearance of the first star is declared, the family sits down at the dinner table.

A traditional Wigilia supper in Poland includes fried carp and barszcz (beetroot soup) with uszka (translated as 'little ears', also known as meatless ravioli). The most common dishes are fish soup, with potato salad, pierogi, gołąbki filled with kasza, pickled herring, and fruit kompot.

Christmas Eve ends with Pasterka, the Midnight Mass at the local church. The tradition commemorates the arrival of the Three Wise Men in Bethlehem and their paying respects and bearing witness to the newborn Messiah. The custom of Christmas night liturgy was introduced in the Christian churches after the second half of the 5th century. In Poland, that custom arrived together with the coming of Christianity. The next day (25 December) begins with the early morning mass followed by daytime masses. According to scripture, the Christmas Day masses are interchangeable, allowing individual parishioners greater flexibility in choosing religious services.

==== Romania and Moldova ====
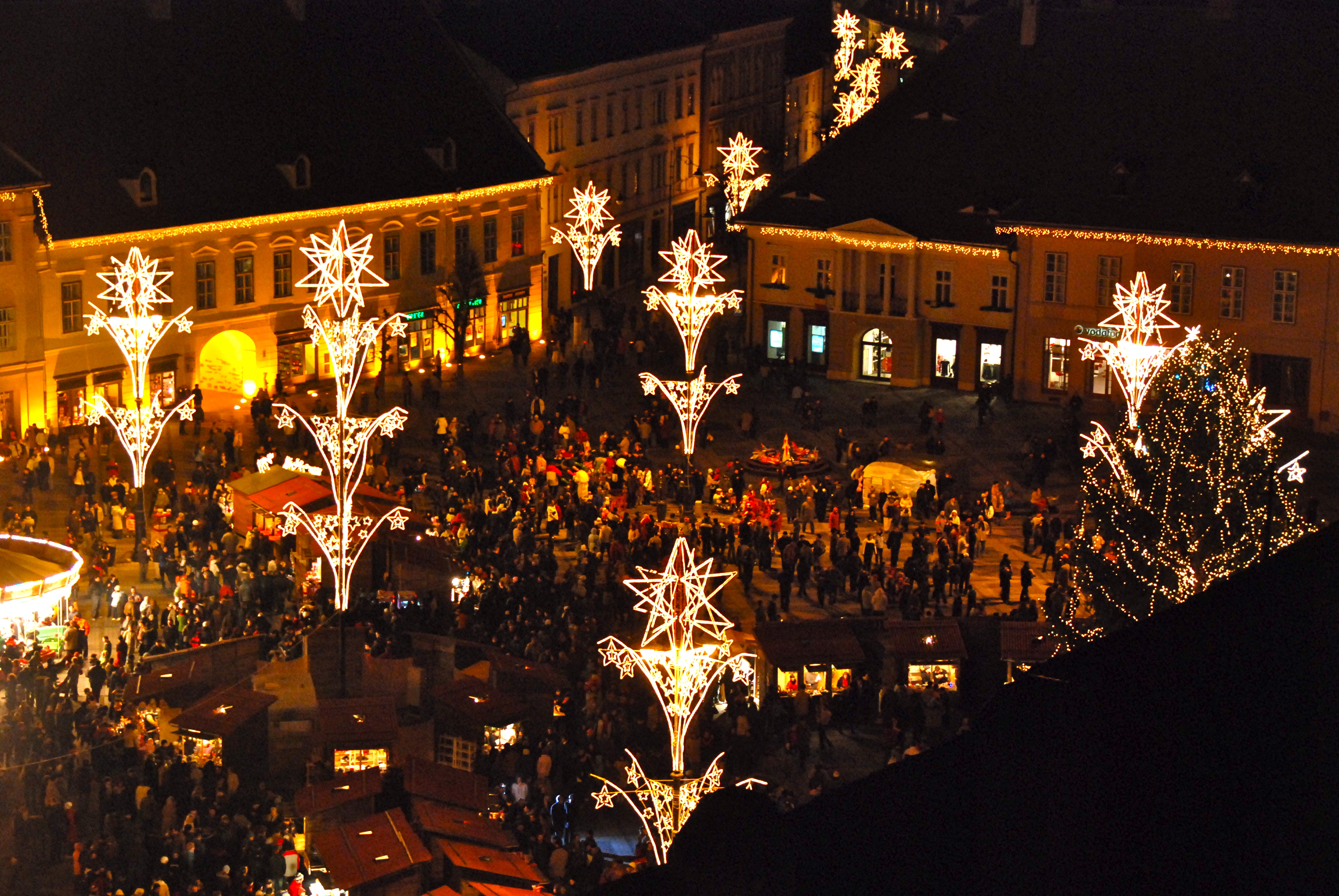
Christmas market in Sibiu, Romania

Romanian food served during the holidays is a hearty, multi-course meal, most of which consists of pork (muscle, fat, and organs). This is mainly a symbolic gesture for St. Ignatius of Antioch.

=== Eastern Europe ===
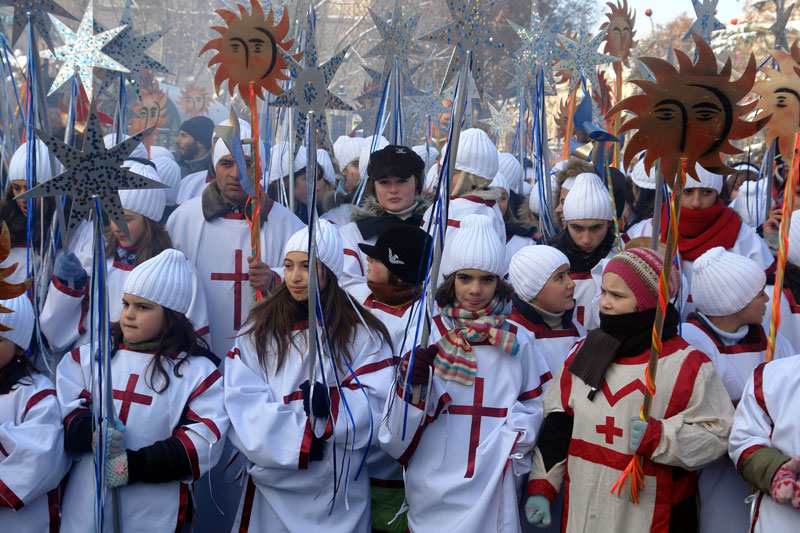
Children at the Alilo march in the streets of Tbilisi

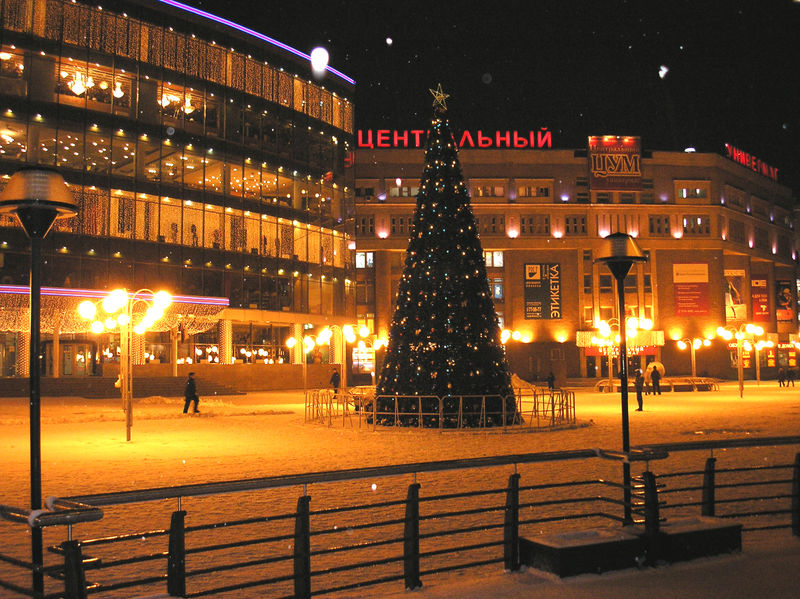
New Year decorations in Nizhny Novgorod

==== Ukraine ====
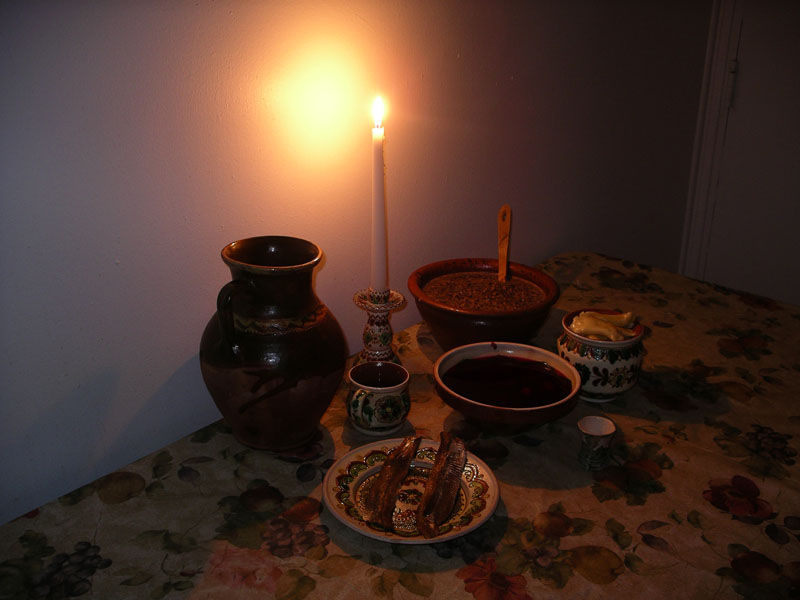
Twelve-dish Christmas Eve supper, Ukraine

Sviata Vecheria or 'Holy Supper' is the central tradition of the Christmas Eve celebrations in Ukrainian homes and takes place in most parts of the country, from many years on 6 January and from 2022 onwards on 24 December. In Western Ukraine, especially in Carpathian Ruthenia, due to historical multi-culturism, until 2023 Christmas can be observed twice—on 25 December and 7 January, often irrespective of whether the family belongs to Ukrainian Greek Catholic Church, the Roman Catholic Church, one of the Ukrainian Orthodox Churches, or one of the Protestant denominations. The Western Ukrainian tradition of two Christmas celebrations, since 2017, is also celebrated nationwide, but the traditions in the western regions, given the Russian invasion of Ukraine, were standardized in 2022 for celebrations within the whole of the nation; with the date finally unified in 2023, the Western Ukrainian form has become the official standard.

=== Northern Europe ===
==== Denmark ====
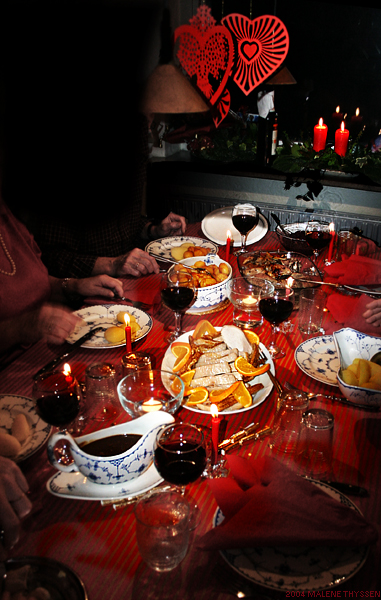
Traditional Danish Christmas dinner

Danes celebrate on 24 December, which is referred to as juleaften (literally 'Yule evening').

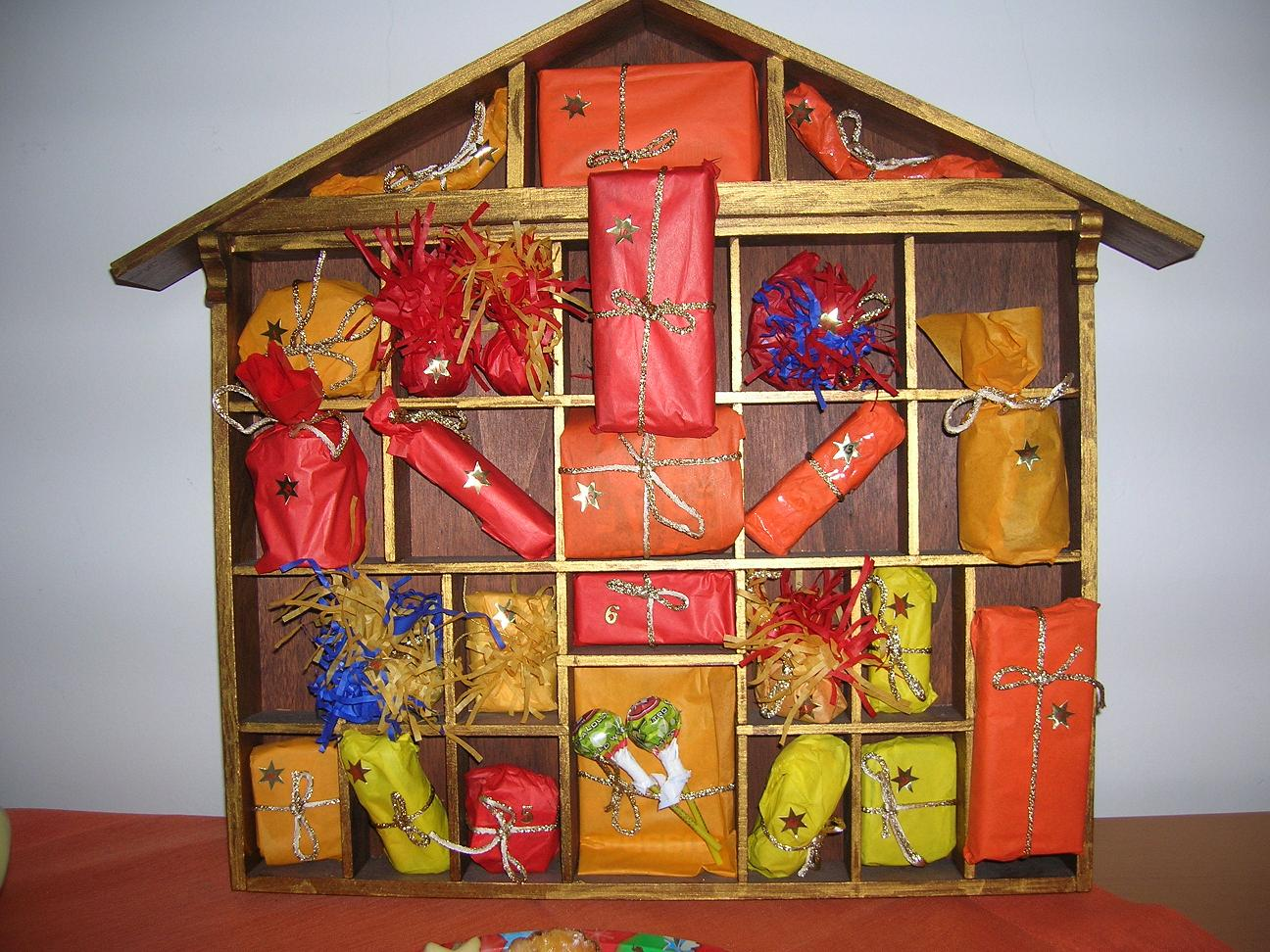
Advent calendar

Another recent Danish tradition is the concept of television julekalendere, special Christmas-themed, advent calendar-type television programs with a daily episode shown on each of the first 24 days of December, culminating on juleaften. Several television stations produce their own programs, most of which are targeted at child viewers. Some television advent calendars become extremely popular and are reprised in subsequent years.

==== Estonia ====
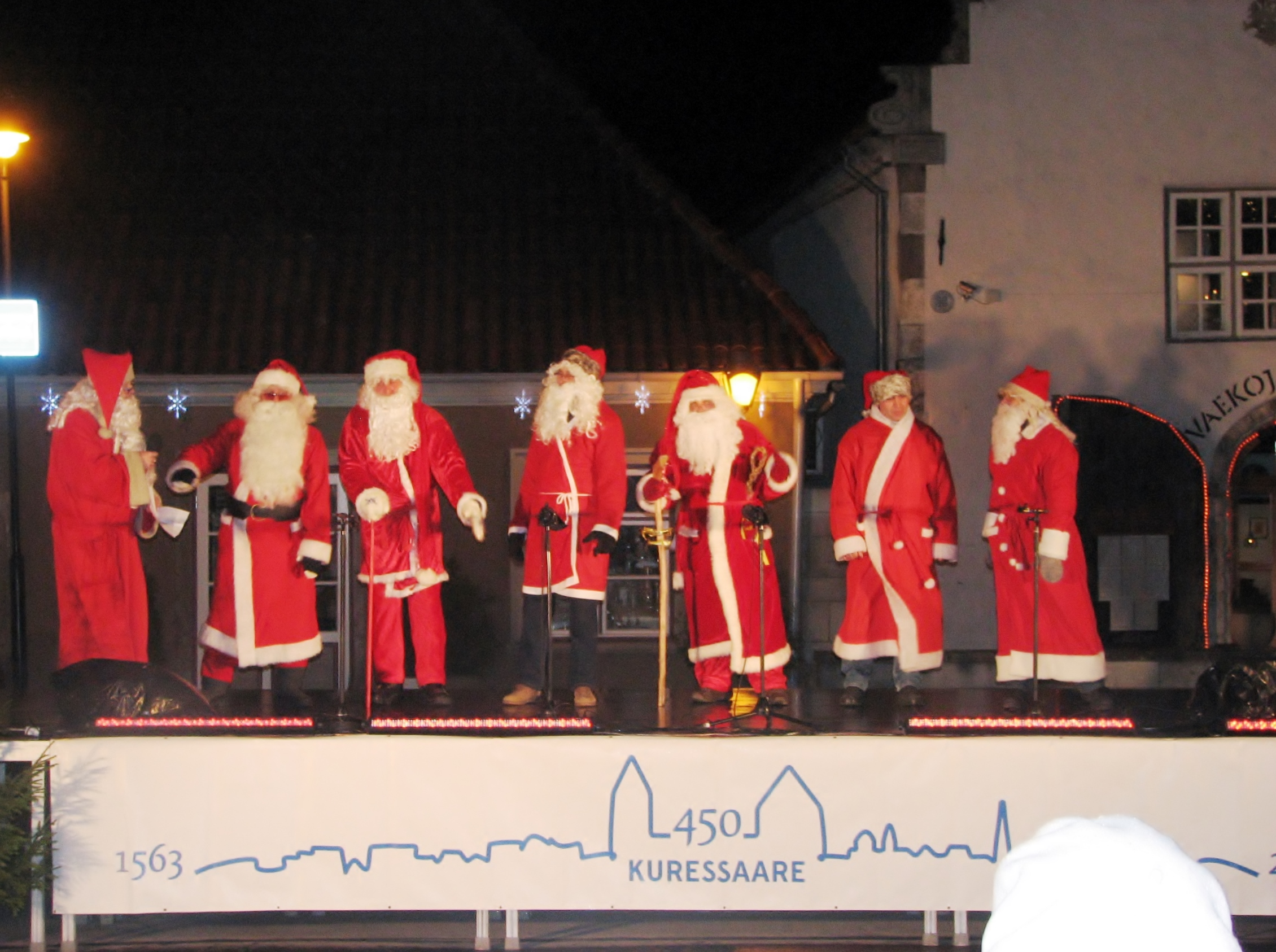
Christmas Santas

==== Finland ====
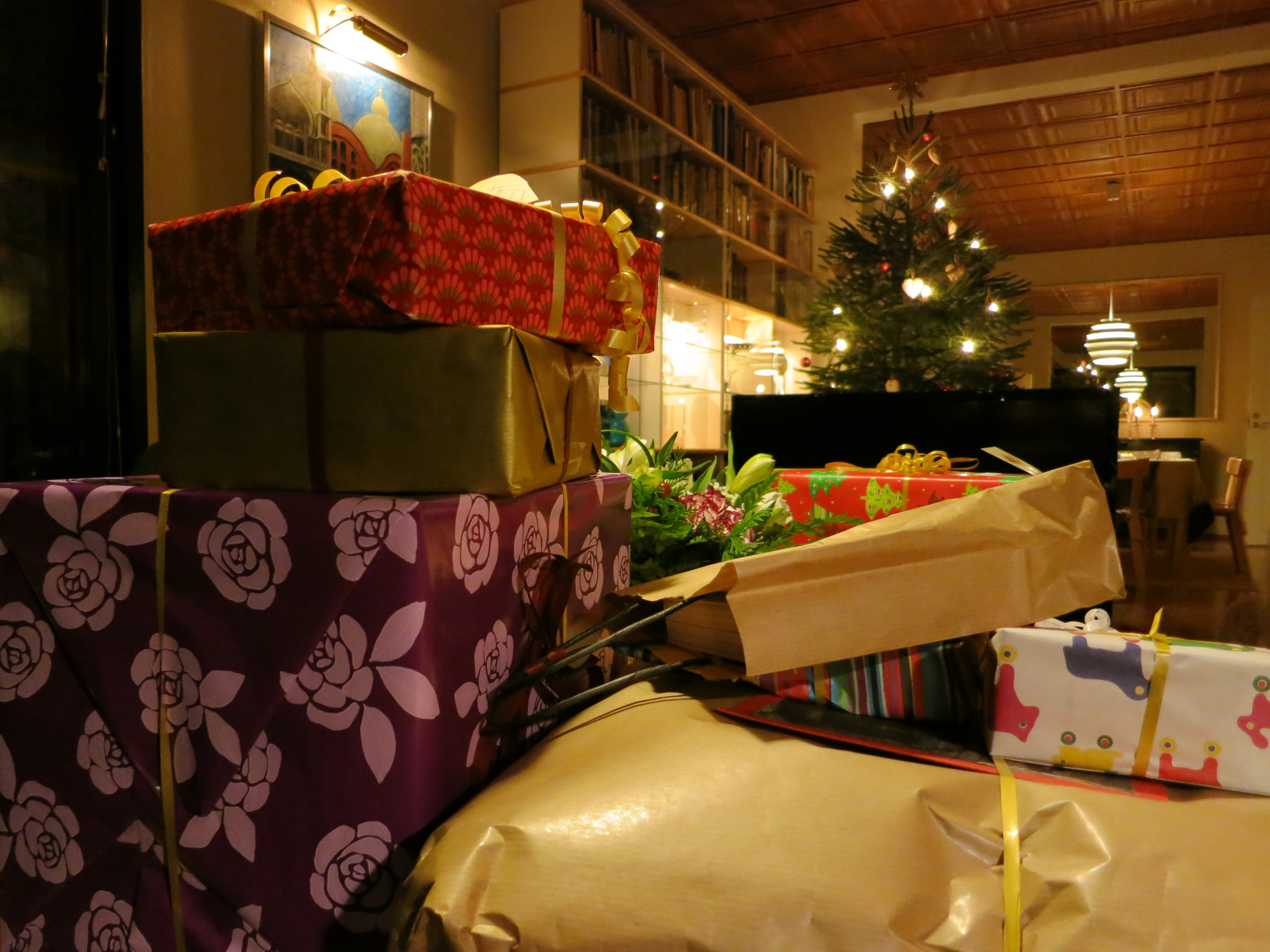
Christmas presents and a tree in Finland

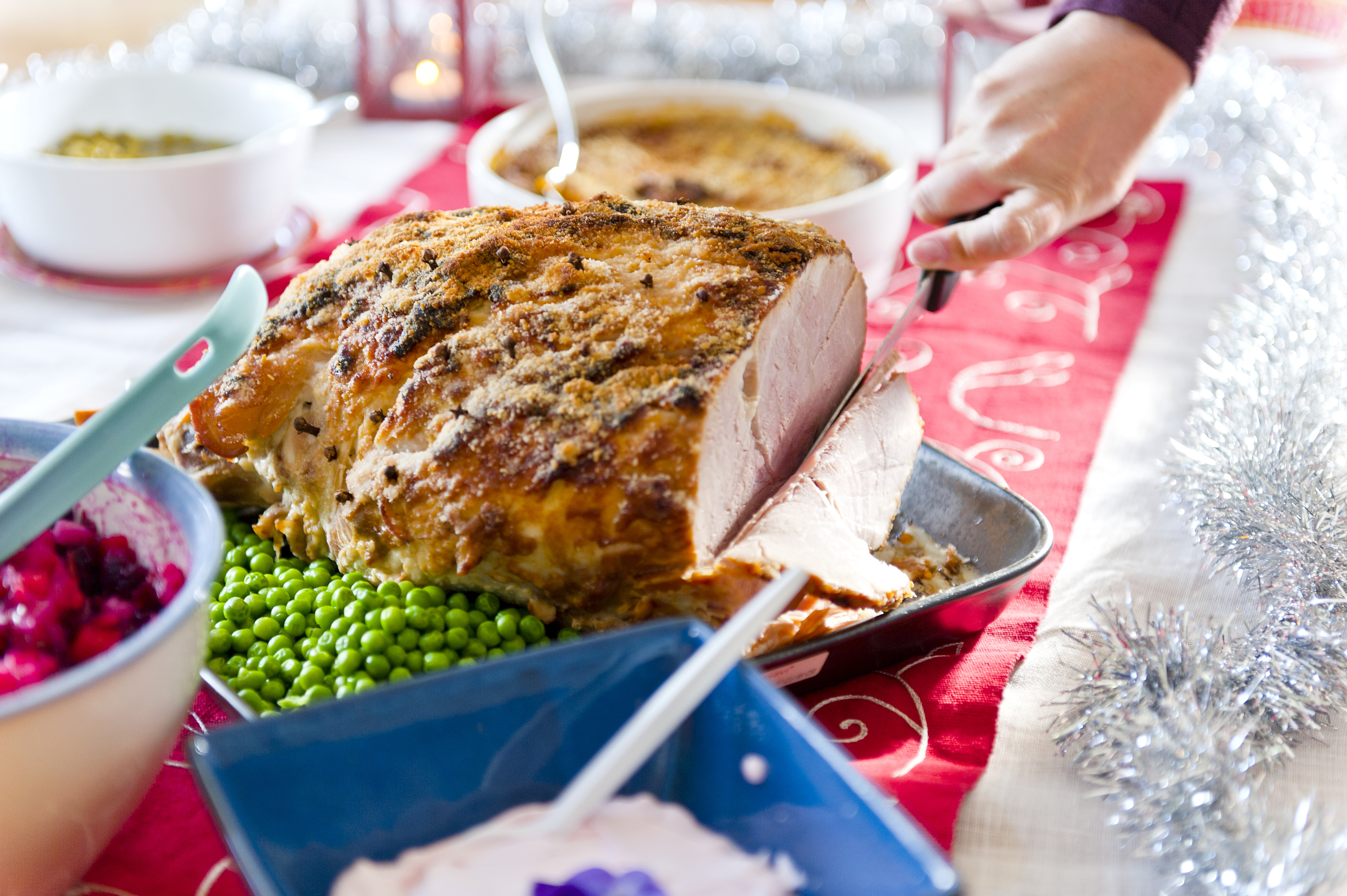
Christmas ham

Christmas is a thoroughly prepared celebration centered on family and home, though it also has a religious dimension. The Christmas season starts from December or even in late November, when shops begin advertising potential Christmas gifts. Christmas decorations and songs become more prominent as Christmas approaches, and children count down the days to Christmas with Advent calendars. Schools and some other places have the day before Christmas Eve (aatonaatto, 23 December) as a holiday. Still, at the latest on Christmas Eve (jouluaatto, 24 December), shops close early and stay closed until 26 December. The main Christmas festivities are held on Christmas Eve on 24 December, while Christmas Day (joulupäivä) and the following day (Tapaninpäivä, 'St. Stephen's Day') are mandatory public holidays in Finland. Schools continue holidays up to the New Year.

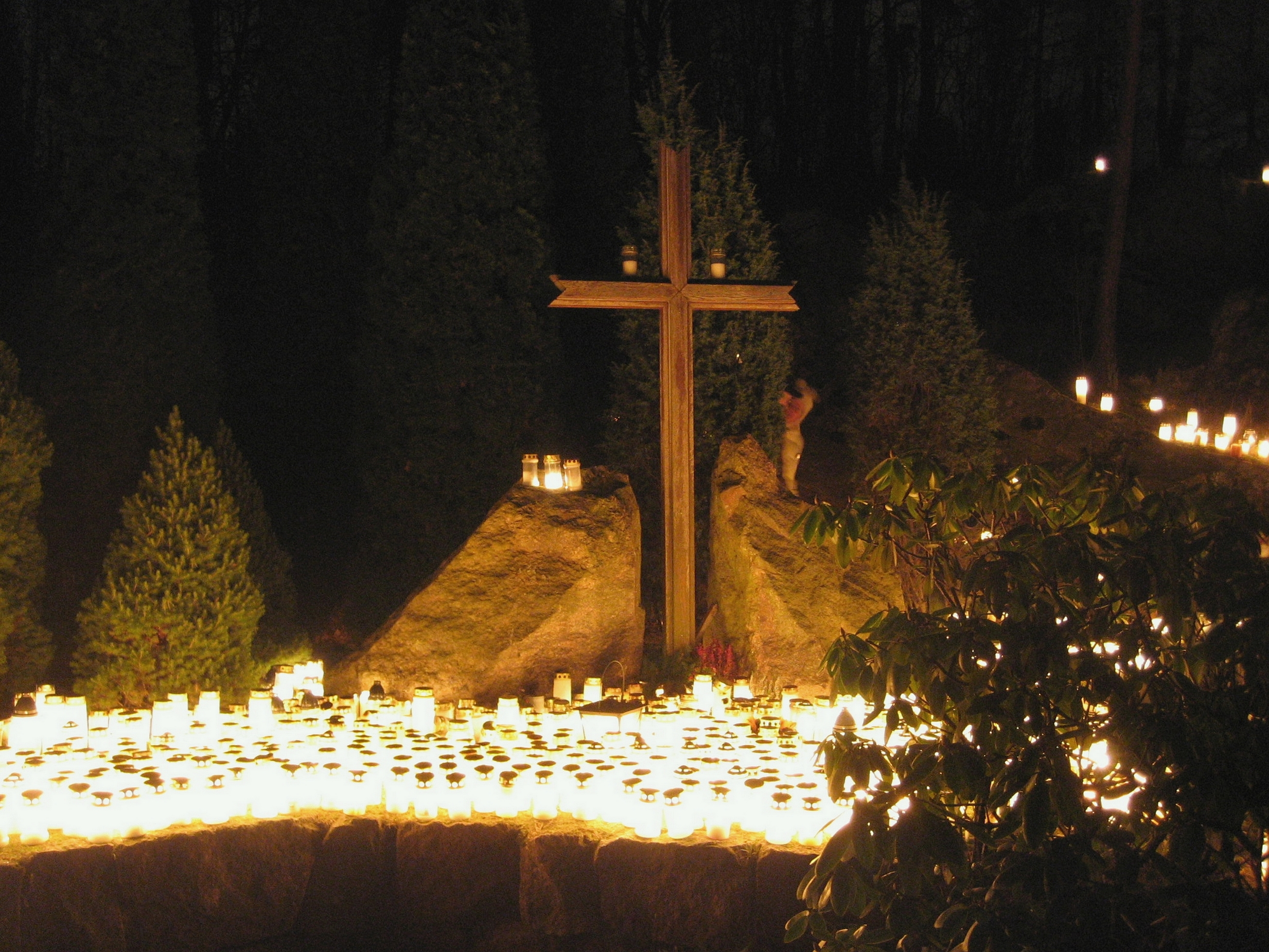
It is traditional in Finland to bring candles to the graves of loved ones on Christmas Eve and All Saints Day.

Finnish people clean their homes well before Christmas and prepare special treats for the festive season. A sheaf of grain, nuts, and seeds is tied on a pole, which is placed in the garden for the birds to feed on. Spruce trees are cut or bought from a market and taken to homes on Christmas Eve or a few days before, where they are decorated. Candles are lit on the Christmas tree, which is traditionally decorated using apples and other fruit, candies, paper flags, cotton, and tinsel, in addition to Christmas ornaments such as stars or baubles. Actual candles are no longer used, being replaced by incandescent or LED lamps. A star symbolizing the Star of Bethlehem is placed at the top of the tree. Just before the Christmas festivities begin, people usually take a sauna for Christmas. The tradition is very old; unlike on normal days, when one would go to the sauna in the evening, on Christmas Eve, one goes before sunset. This tradition is based on a pre-20th-century belief that the spirits of the dead return and use the sauna during the usual sauna hours.

==== Iceland ====
The Christmas or Yule (Jól in Icelandic) celebration in Iceland starts four Sundays before Christmas proper, which begins on 24 December (Advent) and ends thirteen days later on 6 January.

Thirteen days before 24 December, children will leave their shoes by the window so that the Yule Lads can leave small gifts in their shoes. Thirteen days after the 24th, Icelanders say goodbye to the Yule Lads and other mystical creatures such as elves and trolls. There are bonfires held throughout the country while the elves, Yule Lads, and Icelanders dance together before saying goodbye until the next Christmas.

==== Norway ====
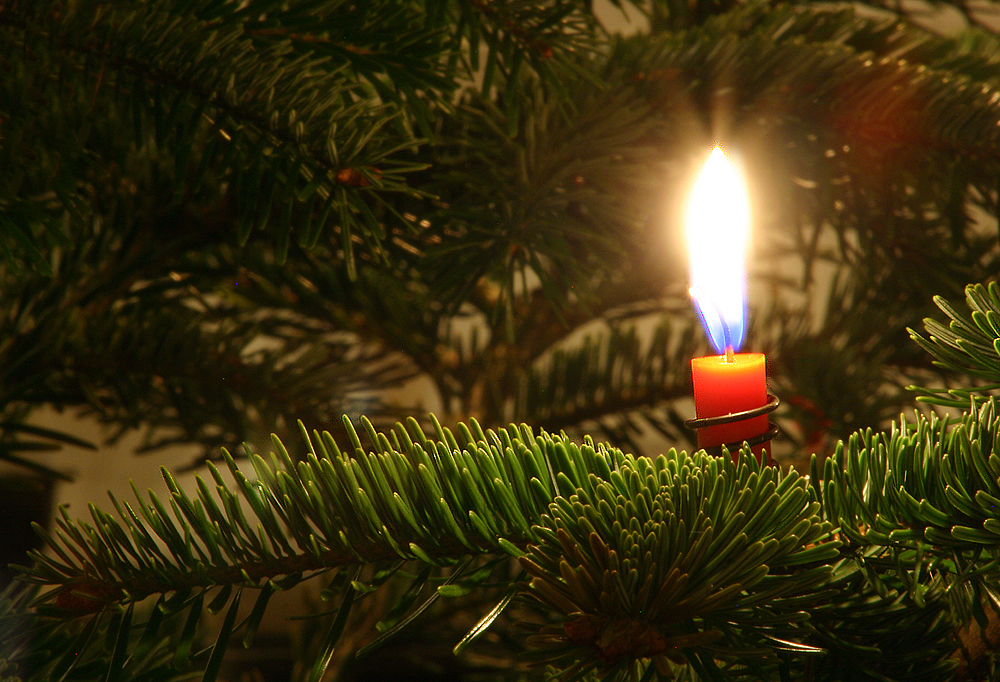
Christmas tree with a candle

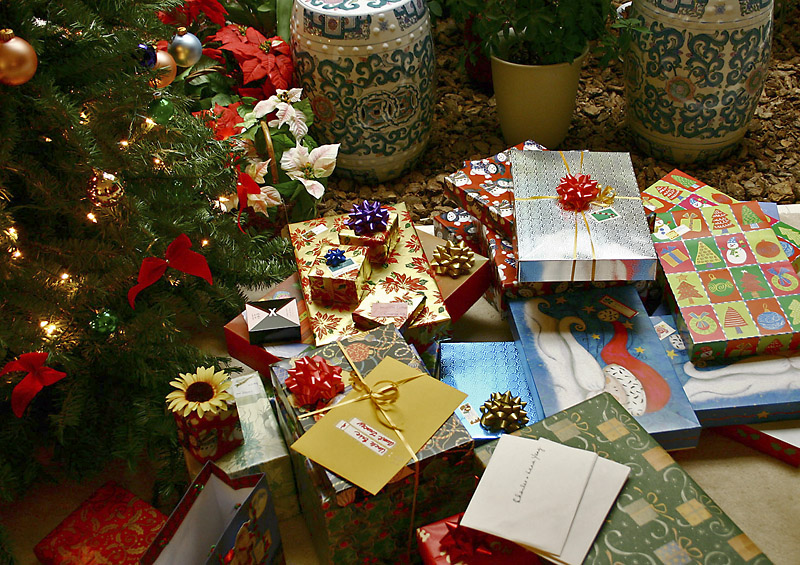
Christmas gifts

The major day of celebration in Norway, as in most of Northern Europe, is 24 December. However, it is legally a regular workday until 4:00 p.m., most stores close early. Church bells chime in the Christmas holiday between 5:00 p.m. and 6:00 p.m. In some families, the Christmas story from Luke 2 will be read from the old family Bible. The main Christmas meal is served in the evening. Common main dishes include pork rib, pinnekjøtt (pieces of lamb rib steamed on a grid of birch wood). Many people also eat lutefisk or fresh, poached cod. Rice porridge is also popular (but most commonly served as an early lunch rather than for the main Christmas dinner), an almond is often hidden in the porridge, and the person who finds it wins a treat or small gift. In some parts of Norway, it is common to place porridge outside (in a barn, outhouse, or even in the forest) to please nissen. In many families, where the parents grew up with different traditions, two different main dishes are served to please everyone. If children are present (and they have behaved well the last year), Julenissen (Santa Claus) pays a visit, and gifts are stored under the Christmas tree.

For many Norwegians, especially families, television is an important part of the early hours of Christmas Eve. Many Norwegians watch the Czech-German fairy tale Three Wishes for Cinderella (Norwegian title: Tre nøtter til Askepott), the Disney Christmas cavalcade From All of Us to All of You.

25 December is considered a very quiet and relaxed day. Church services are well attended. The old tradition of a very early-morning service before breakfast has been replaced in most areas by a late-morning service. Afterward, many families get together for a large festive meal.

==== Sweden ====
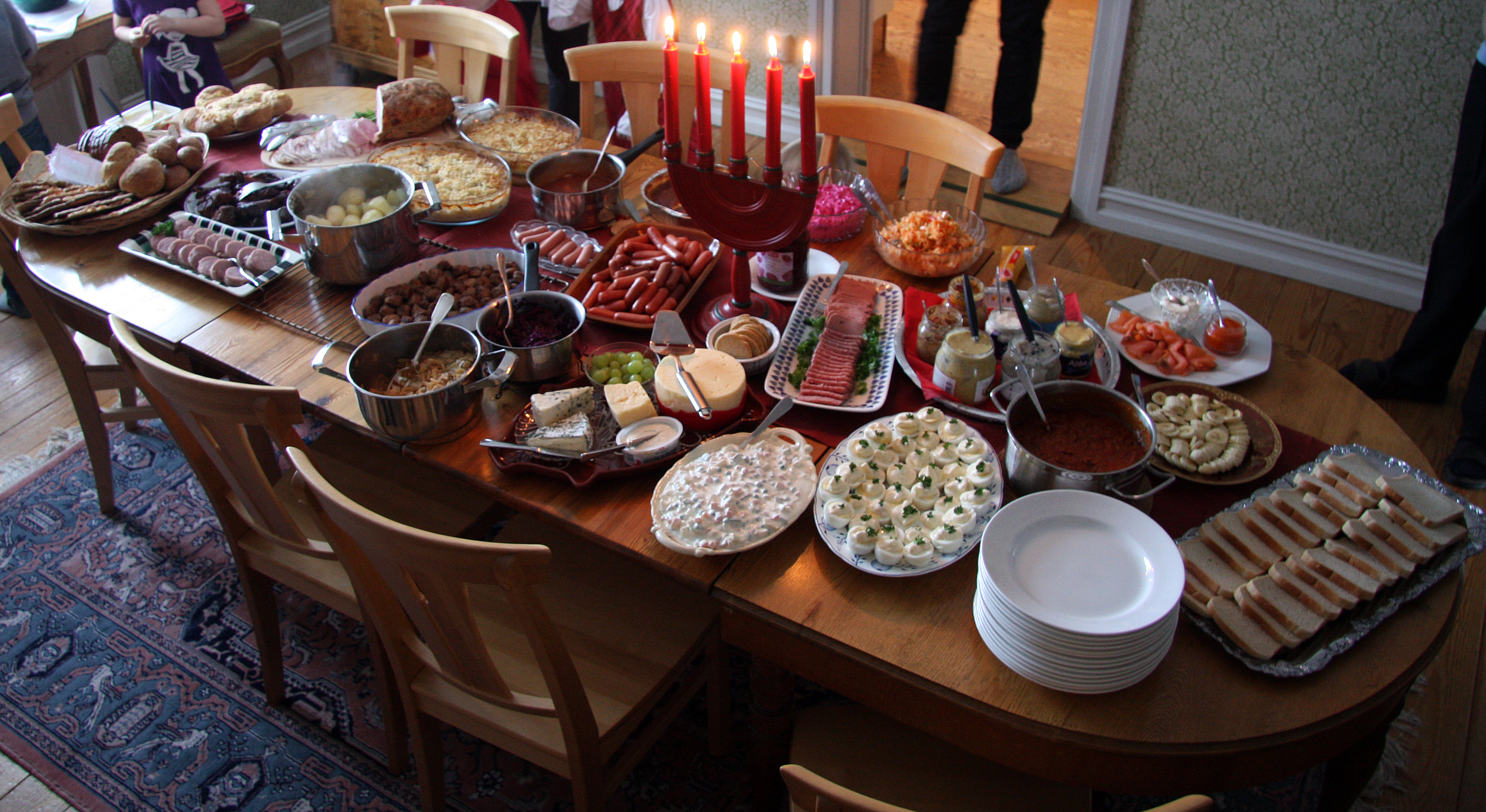
Traditional julbord, or Christmas table

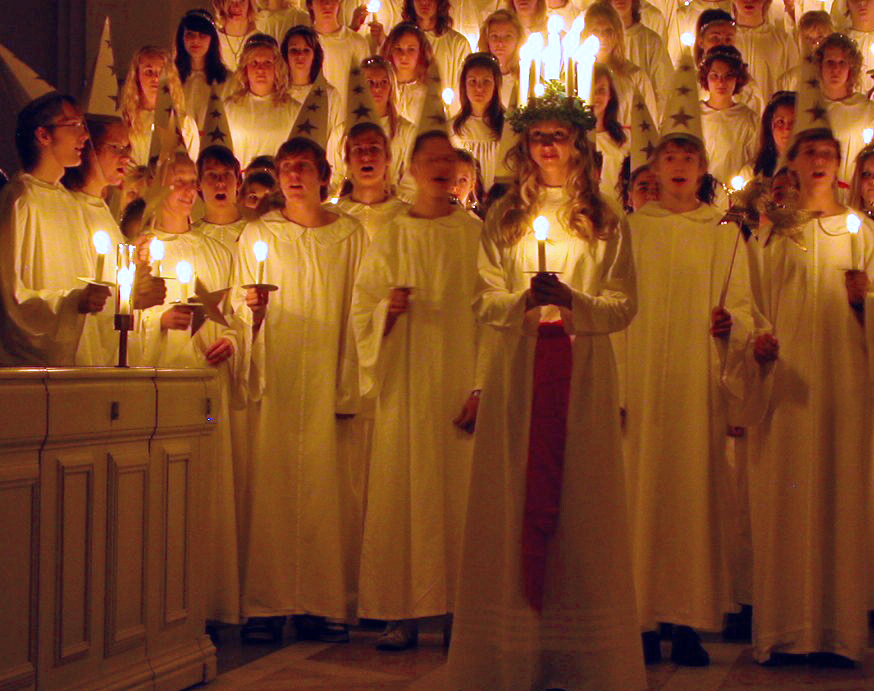
Saint Lucy's Day 2006

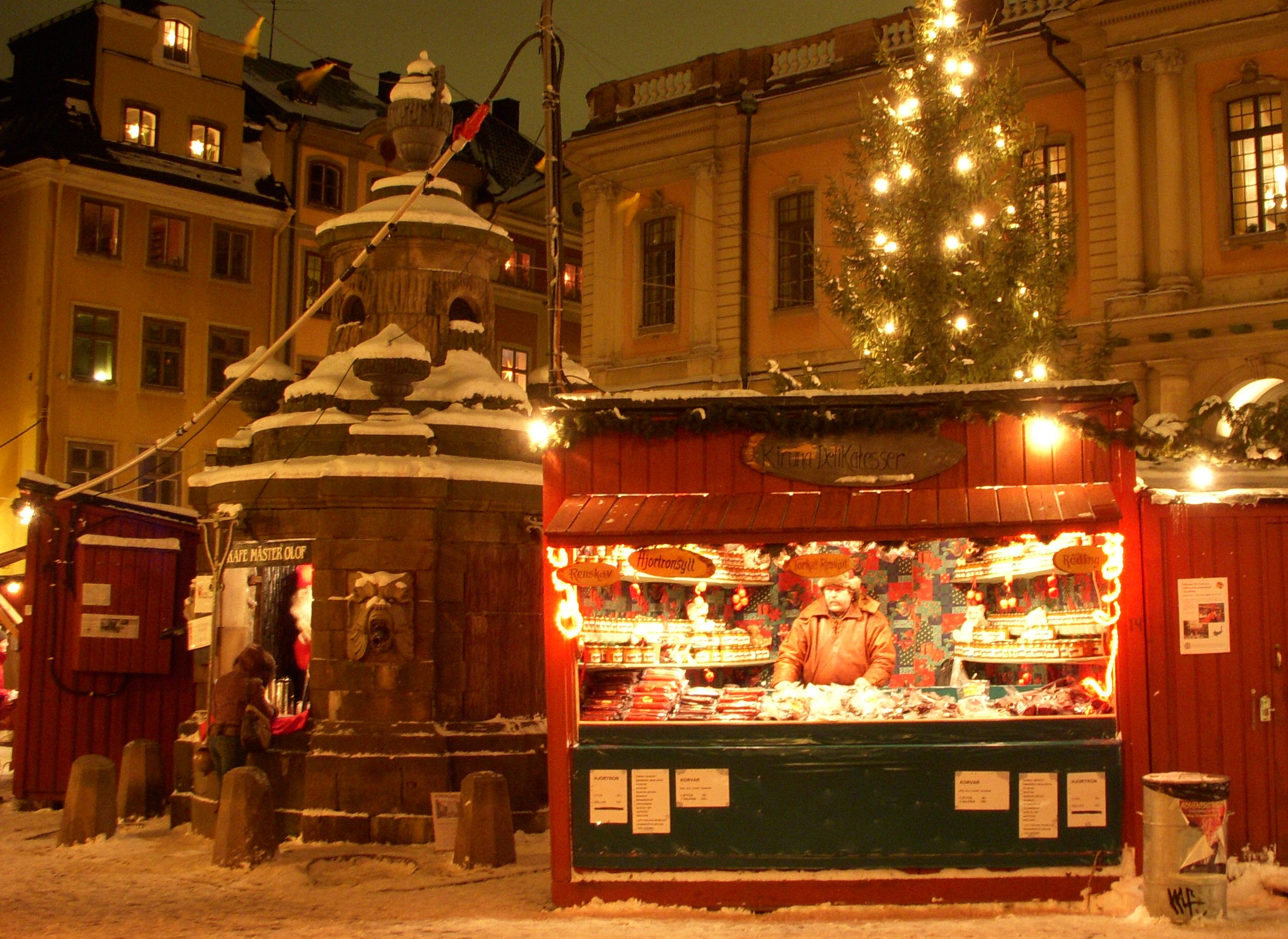
Christmas market with Christmas tree in Stockholm

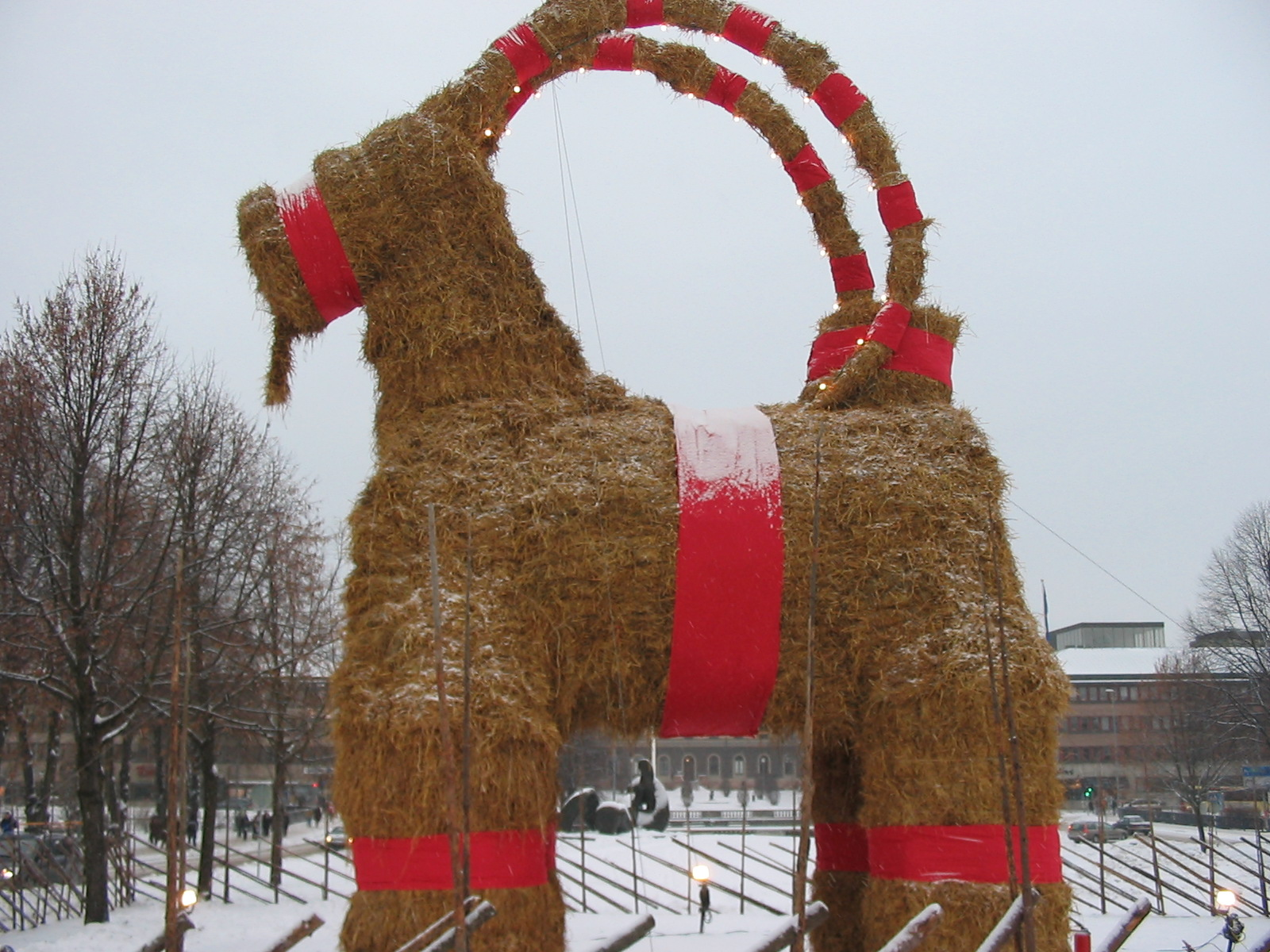
Julbock, a giant Christmas goat at the Gävle town market, Sweden

The pre-Christian holiday of Yule, or jól, was the most important in Scandinavia and Northern Europe. Saint Lucy's Day (locally known as Luciadagen) is the first major Christmas celebration before Christmas itself. The eldest daughter, arising early and wearing her Lucy garb of white robe, red sash, and a wire crown covered with whortleberry-twigs with nine lighted candles fastened in it, awakens the family, singing "Santa Lucia", serving them coffee and saffron buns (St. Lucia buns), thus ushering in the Christmas season.

Christmas is an occasion celebrated with food. Television also plays a big role, many families watch the Disney Christmas special Kalle Anka och hans vänner önskar God Jul (From All of Us to All of You), Karl Bertil Jonssons julafton (animated short), or a re-run of the Svensson, Svensson episode "God Jul!" ('Merry Christmas') on the TV channel SVT1.

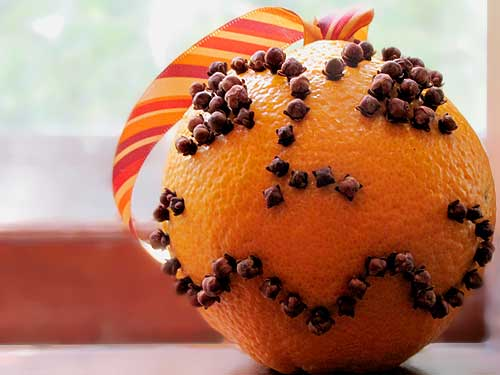
Around Christmas, people hang oranges decorated with cloves in the window or place it on the table.

Many Swedes still adhere to the tradition that each present should have a rhyme written on the wrapping paper, to hint at the contents without revealing them.

After 24 December, the Christmas celebrations have more or less come to an end. Some people attend the julottan, an early morning church service on 25 December. This service was historically the main service of Christmas—nowadays, the Midnight Mass has become increasingly popular. Others attend a simpler service called Christmas Prayer in the afternoon of Christmas Eve, but many Swedes do not attend church at all during Christmas as the country is very secular. Even so, most families do set up a Julkrubba ('Christmas Crib'). On 13 January (locally known as knutdagen or tjugondag knut 'twentieth-day Christmas'), 20 days after Christmas, the Christmas celebrations come to an end, and all Christmas decorations are removed.

=== Southern Europe ===
==== Bosnia and Herzegovina, Croatia, and Slovenia ====
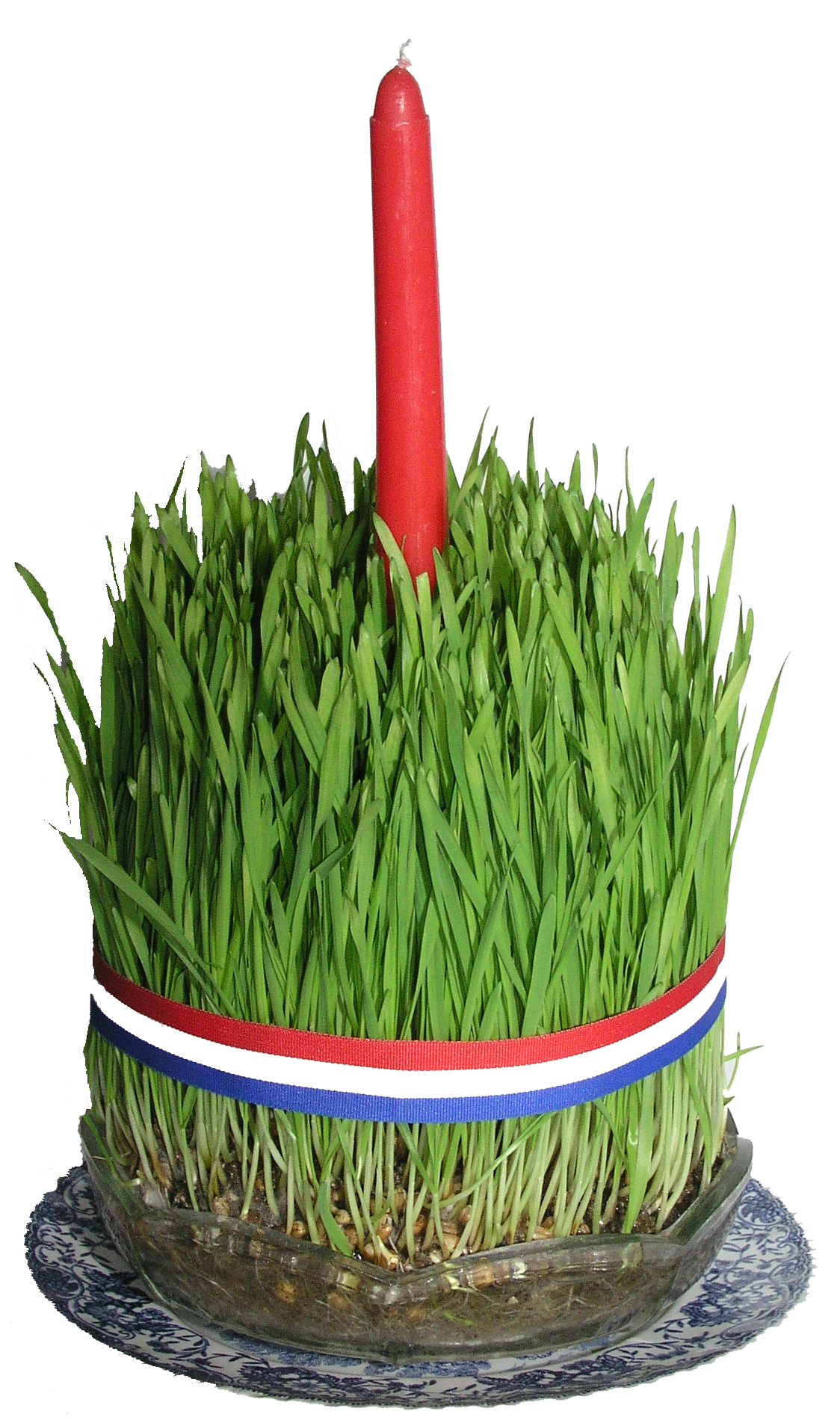
Croatian wheat grass, planted on St. Lucy's, used for Christmas candles

In Bosnia and Herzegovina, Croatia, and Slovenia, Christmas (Croatian: Božić, Slovene: Božič) is celebrated mainly as a religious holiday. The festivities begin on Saint Nicholas's Day on 6 December (in Slovenia) or on Saint Lucy's Day on 13 December (in Croatia), depending on the region. Saint Lucy or Saint Nicholas brings children presents, and Saint Nicholas is said to be accompanied by Krampus, who steals away the presents of bad children. This "anti-Santa" is said to have one cloven hoof, a handful of heavy chains, and a sack on his back to collect naughty children.

==== Bulgaria ====
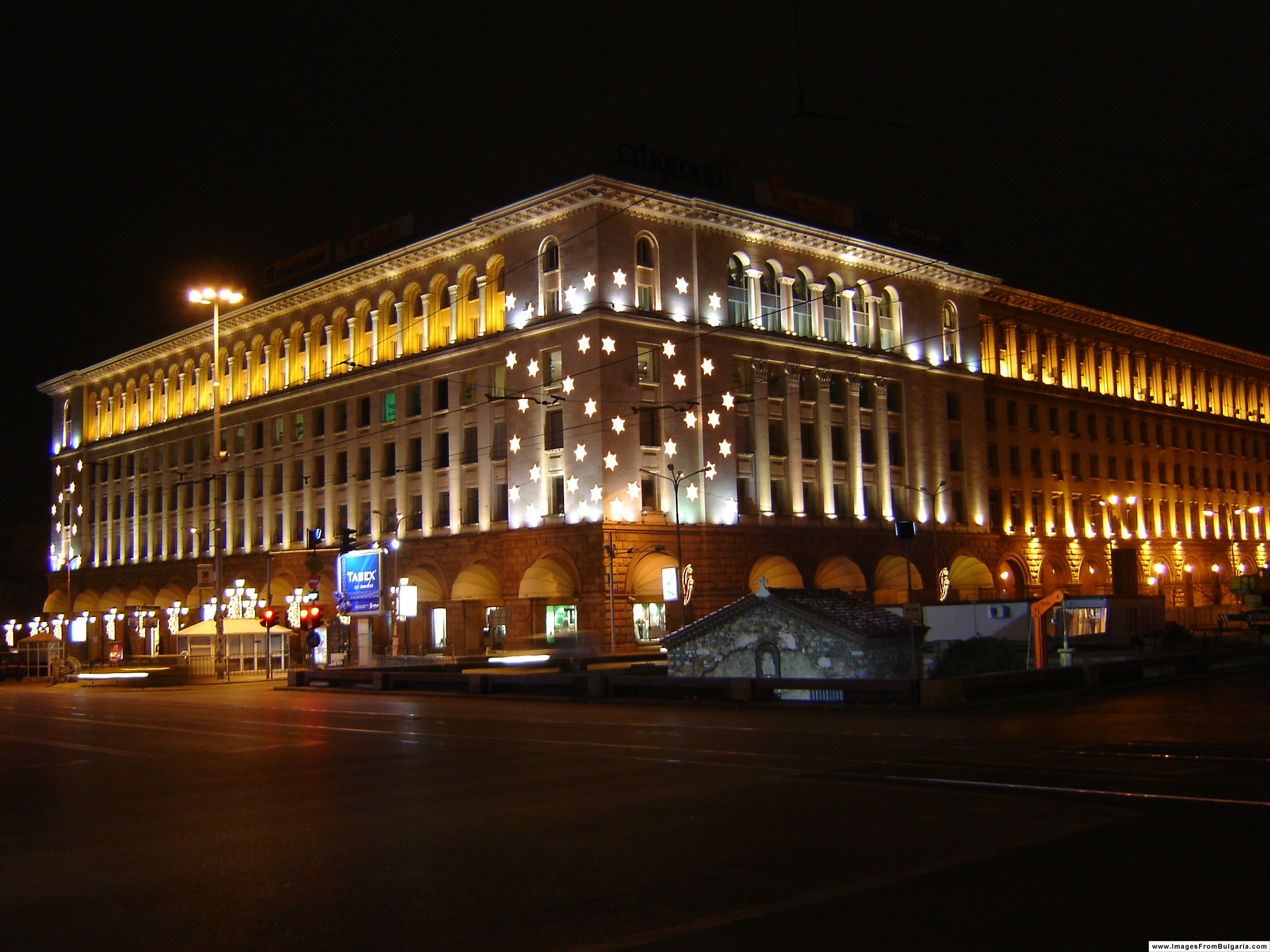
TZUM department store at Christmastime, Sofia, Bulgaria

In Bulgaria, Christmas (Bulgarian: Коледа, Koleda or more formally Рождество Христово, Rozhdestvo Hristovo, 'Nativity of Jesus') is celebrated on 25 December. It is preceded by Christmas Eve (Бъдни вечер, Badni vecher). Traditionally, Christmas Eve would be the climax of the Nativity Fast, and thus only an odd number of Lenten dishes are presented on that evening. The table is usually not cleared after the dinner and until the next morning, to leave some food for the holy spirits – a custom which probably comes from pagan pre-Christian times. On that day, a Bulgarian budnik is set alight. On Christmas, meat dishes are already allowed and are typically served.

Among the Bulgarian Christmas traditions is koleduvane, which involves boy carolers (коледари, koledari) visiting the neighboring houses starting at midnight on Christmas Eve, wishing health, wealth, and happiness. Another custom is the baking of a traditional round loaf (пита, pita). The pita is broken into pieces by the head of the family: a piece is given to each family member, a piece is kept as a valuable possession, and a piece is set aside for God. A coin is hidden inside the pita, and whoever gets the coin will have luck, health, and prosperity in the coming year.

==== Italy ====
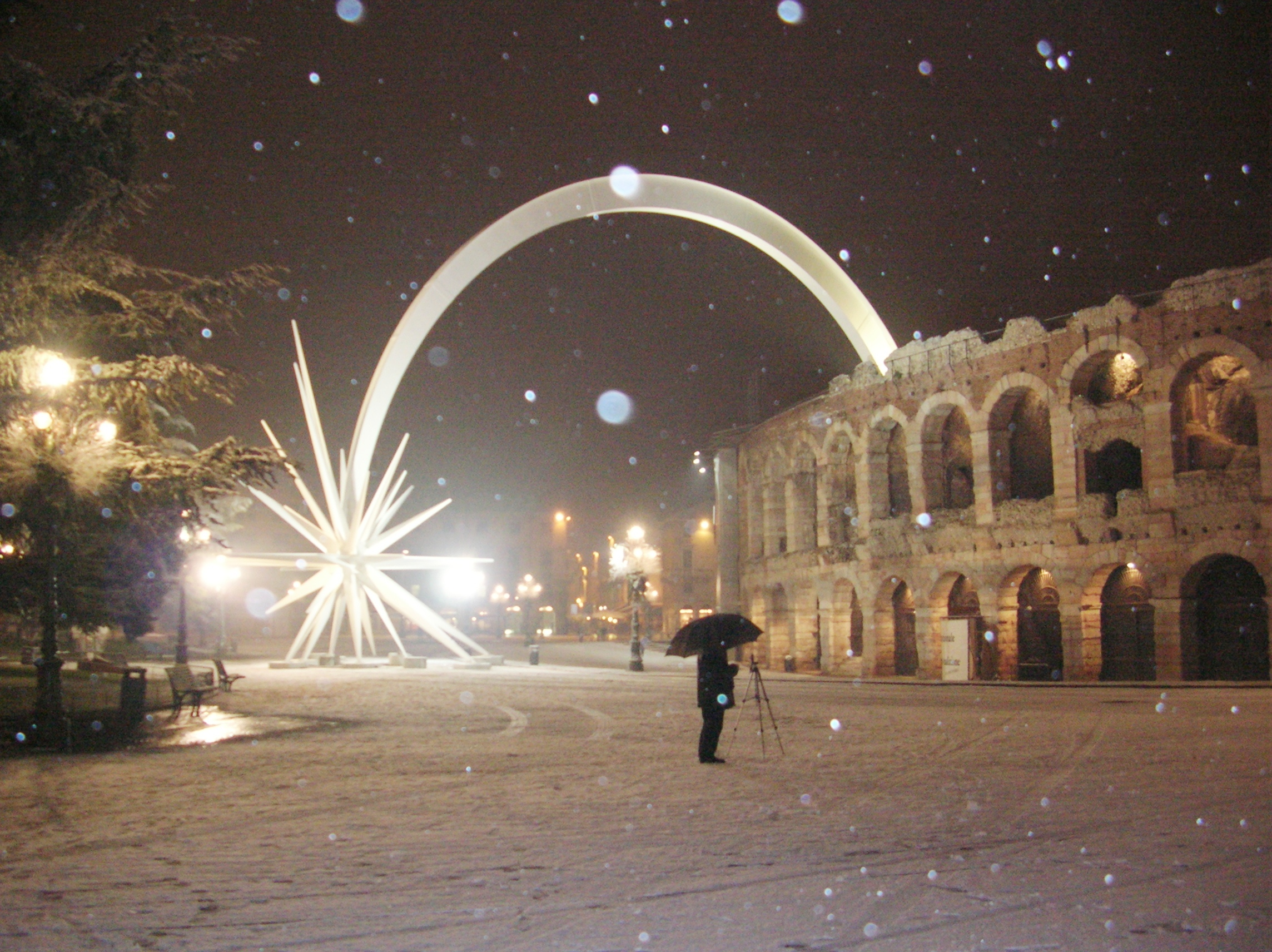
Christmas lights in Verona, Italy

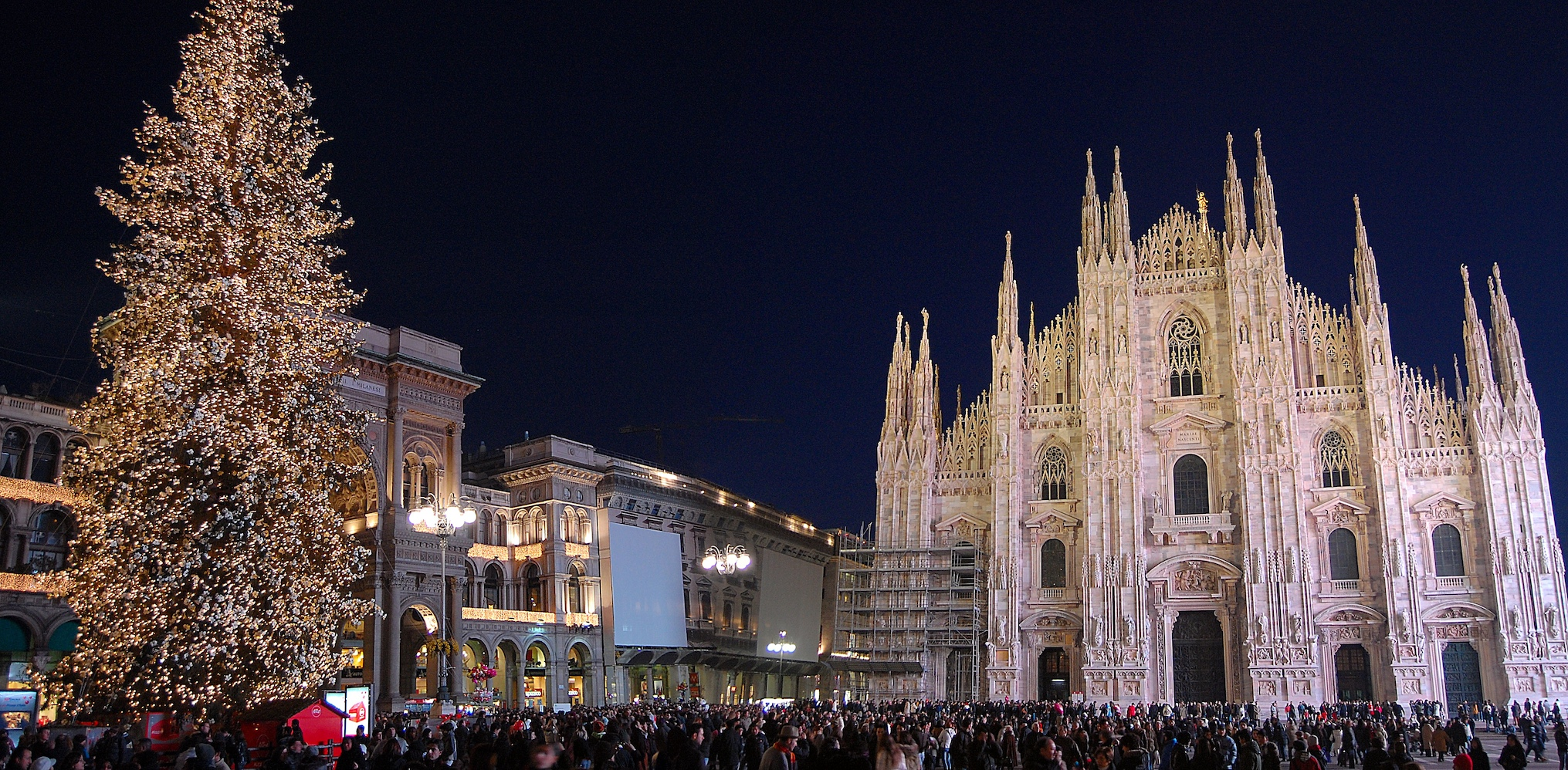
Christmas tree in Milan, in front of the Milan Cathedral, Italy

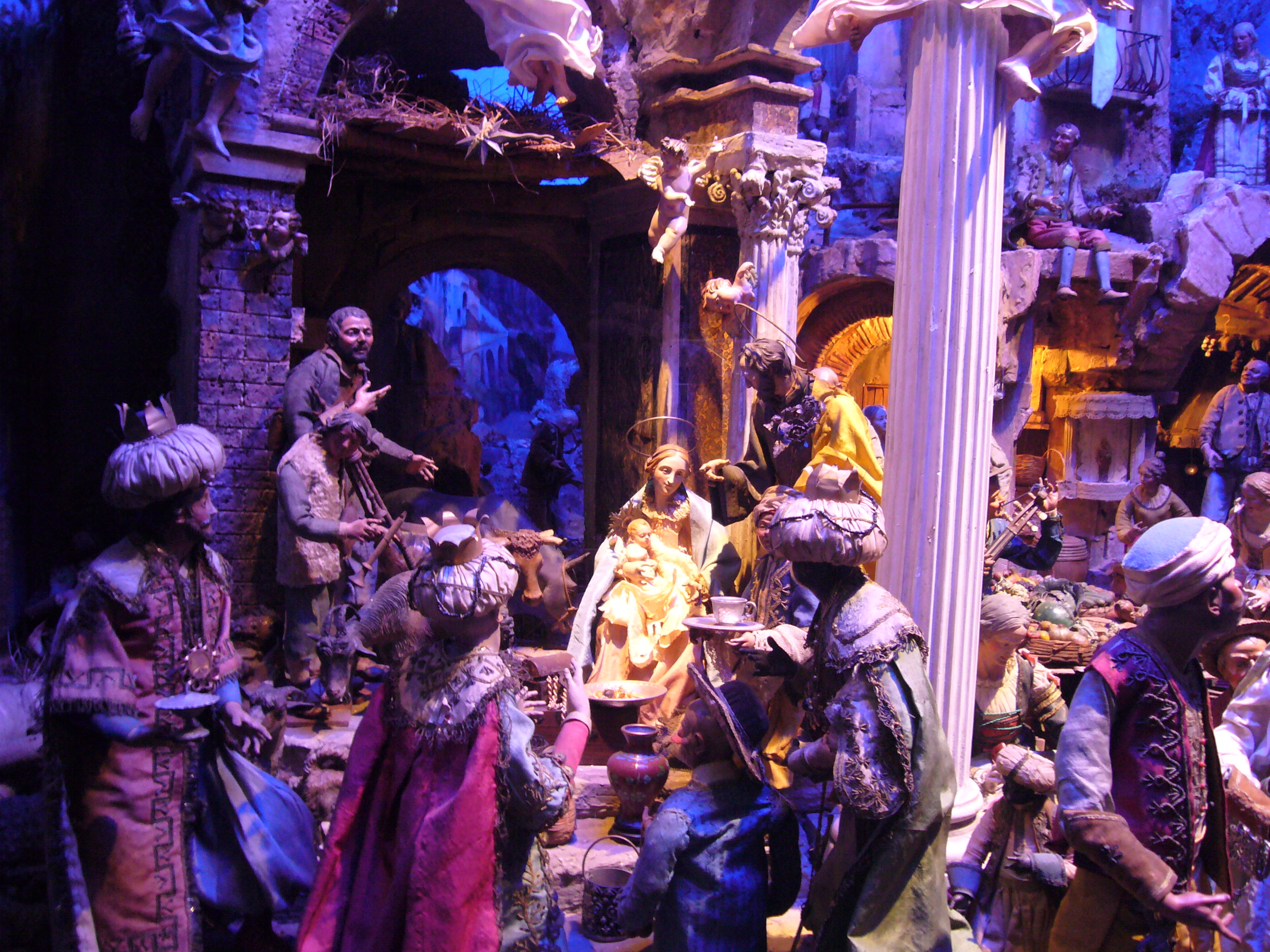
Neapolitan nativity scene in Rome, Italy

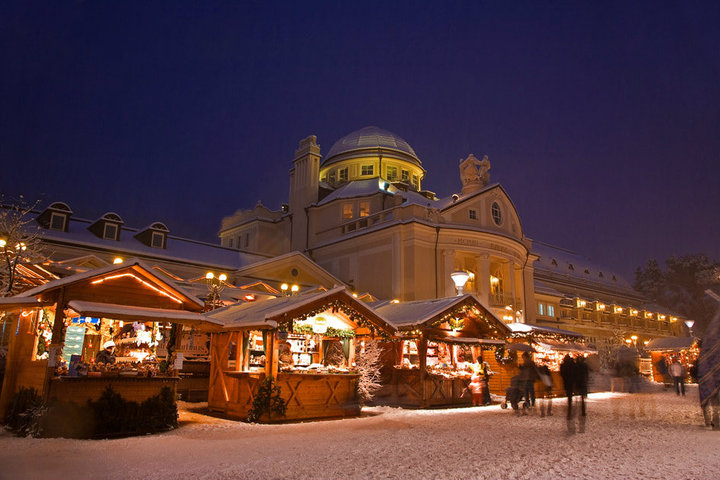
Christmas market in Merano, Italy

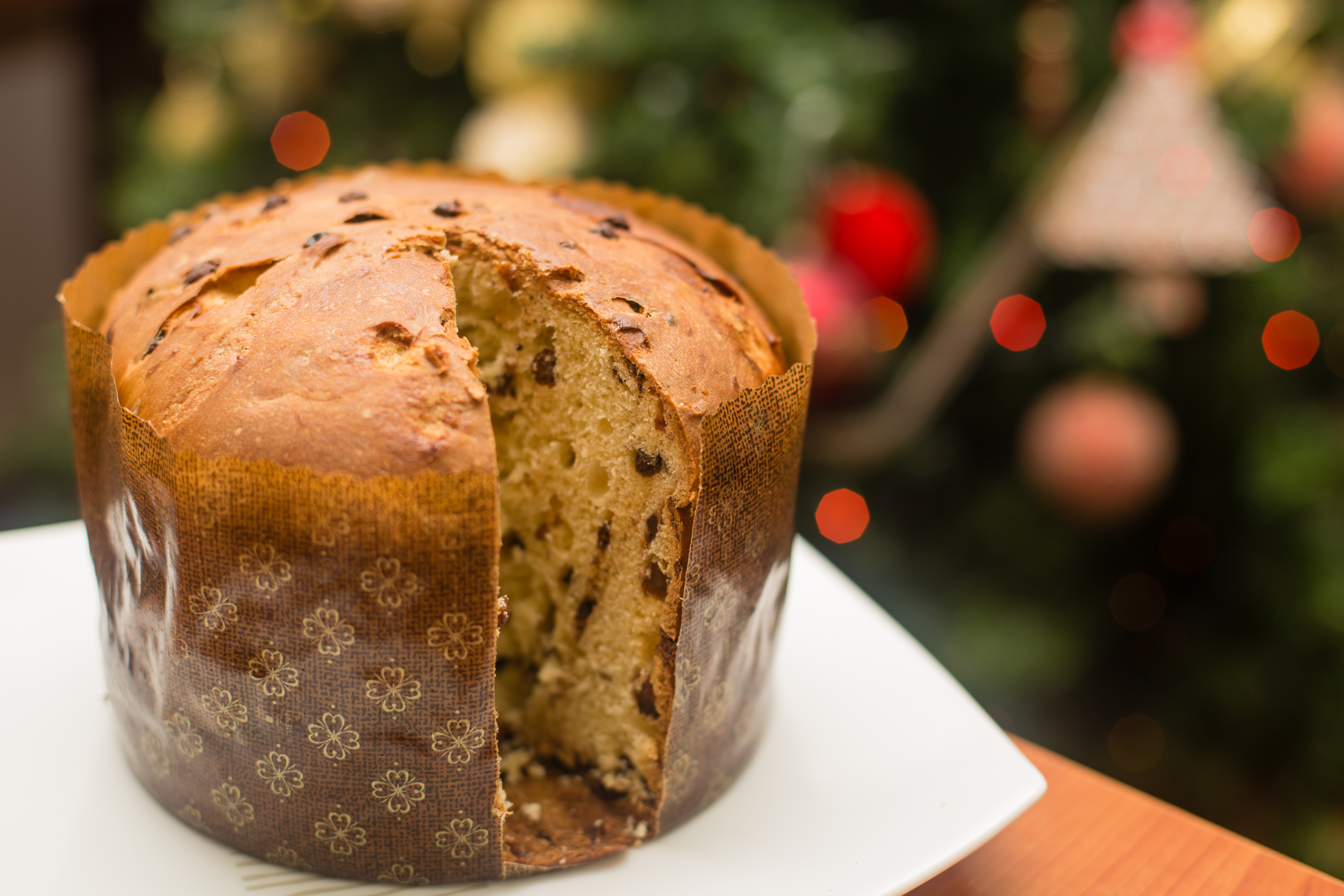
Panettone

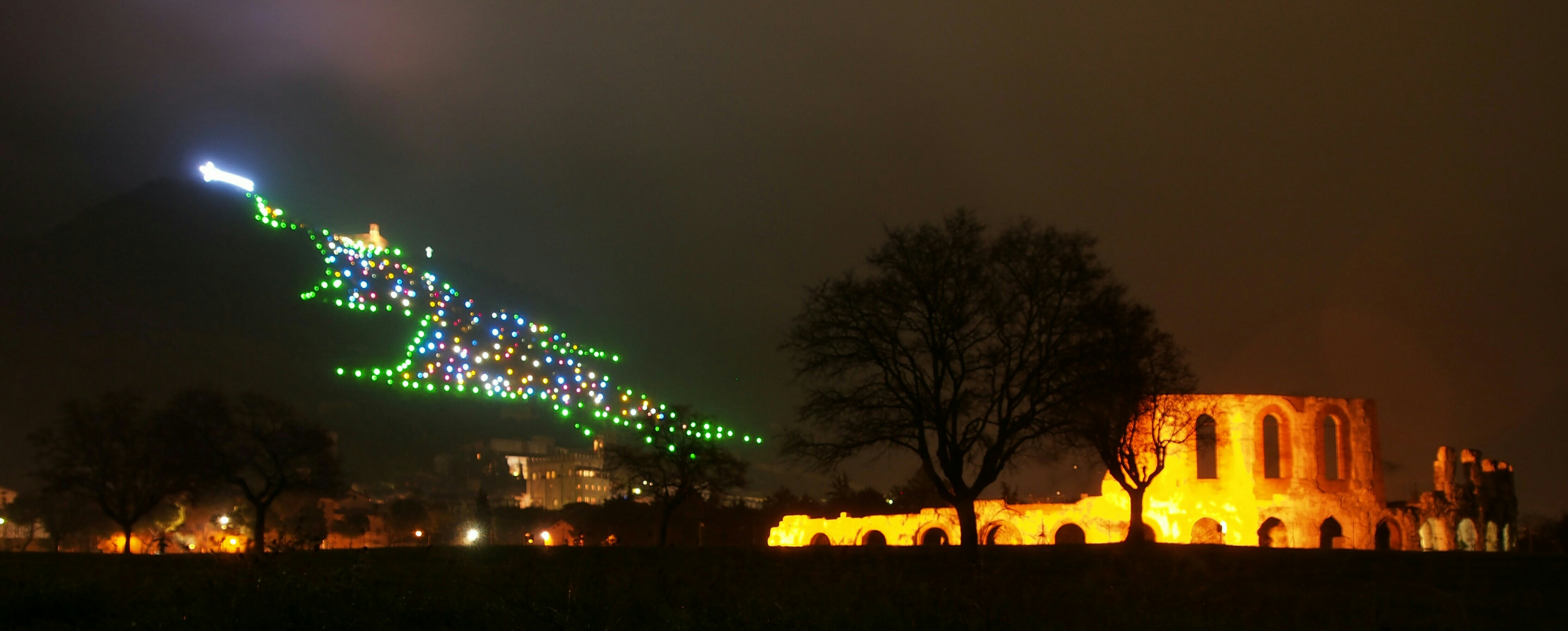
Mount Ingino Christmas Tree in Gubbio, Italy, the tallest Christmas tree in the world

Christmas in Italy (Italian: Natale, pronounced [naˈtaːle]) begins on 8 December, with the Feast of the Immaculate Conception, the day on which traditionally the Christmas tree is mounted and ends on 6 January, of the following year with the Epiphany (Italian: Epifania). The Italian term Natale derives from the Latin natalis, which literally means 'birth', and the greetings in Italian are buon Natale (Merry Christmas) and felice Natale (Happy Christmas).

The Feast of the Immaculate Conception (Italian: Festa dell'Immacolata Concezione) on 8 December is a national holiday in Italy. Christmas decorations, including the presepe (nativity scene), as well as the Christmas tree, are usually put up on this day. Some modern takes on this holiday involve them hanging vultures to symbolize the cleaning of their spirits.

Saint Lucy's Day (Italian: Giorno di Santa Lucia) is celebrated as a Catholic holiday in Sicily and the northern regions of Italy on the supposed shortest day of the year, which is 13 December.

Christmas is celebrated in Italy similarly to other Western European countries, with a strong emphasis given to the Christian meaning of the holiday and its celebration by the Catholic Church, also reinforced by the still widespread tradition of setting up the presepe, a tradition initiated by Saint Francis of Assisi. It is quite common to attend Midnight Mass on Christmas Eve and practice the old custom of abstinence from meat on the day.

A popular Christmas Day dish in Naples and in Southern Italy is female eel or capitone, which is a female eel. A traditional Christmas Day dish from Northern Italy is capon (gelded chicken). Abbacchio is more common in Central Italy. The Christmas Day dinner traditionally consists by typical Italian Christmas dishes, such as agnolini, cappelletti, Pavese agnolotti, capon, lamb, eel, panettone, pandoro, torrone, panforte, struffoli, mustacciuoli, bisciola, cavallucci, veneziana, pizzelle, zelten, or others, depending on the regional cuisine.

The ancient Christmas festival called Ndocciata is celebrated on 8 December and Christmas Eve in Agnone, Molise, with a parade of torches leading up to the "Bonfire of Brotherhood". On Christmas Eve, in the squares of many towns of eastern Sicily, a large bonfire, U Zuccu, is lit to warm the Baby Jesus.

Traditions regarding the exchange of gifts vary by region, as this might take place on either Christmas Eve or Christmas Day. Presents for children are left underneath the Christmas tree either by Santa Claus (called Babbo Natale) or, according to older traditions, by Baby Jesus himself. In some regions, children receive gifts earlier (at Saint Lucy's Day) or later (on Epiphany).

In 1991, the so-called Gubbio Christmas Tree (a structure in the shape of a tree set along a mountain slope), 650 meters high and decorated with over 700 lights, was entered in the Guinness Book of Records as the tallest Christmas tree in the world.

In Italy, Saint Stephen's Day became a public holiday in 1947, where previously it was a normal working day; the Catholic Church also celebrates it as a religious holiday, even if not as a precept, as it is in Germany and other German-speaking countries. The reason for the public holiday in Italy, not required by the Catholic Church despite the fame of the saint, is to be found in the intention of prolonging the Christmas holiday, creating two consecutive public holidays, which also happens in the case of Easter Monday, a non-religious holiday, but which only wants to lengthen Easter. Before 1947, the two days were working days, with banks and offices open.

On 6 January (Epiphany, in Italian Epifania), decorations are usually taken down; in some areas, female puppets are burned on a pyre (called falò), to symbolize, along with the end of the Christmas period, the death of the old year and the beginning of a new one. While gifts are now given at Christmas by an American-style Santa Claus as well, Italy holds fast to its tradition of native gift-givers. On the eve of the 6th, la Befana, the good Epiphany witch, is thought to ride the night skies on a broomstick, bringing good children gifts and sweets, and bad ones charcoal or bags of ashes. In other areas, it is the Three Wise Men who bring gifts, especially oranges symbolizing gold, and chocolate symbolizing their kisses to good children. In some municipalities, most famously in Milan, the custom of the Corteo dei Re Magi (Three Kings' Procession) is elaborately celebrated with a parade welcoming the Wise Men and the distribution of sweets. In other places, such as Treviso, the day is celebrated with bonfires, the sparks of which are said to predict the future of the new year.

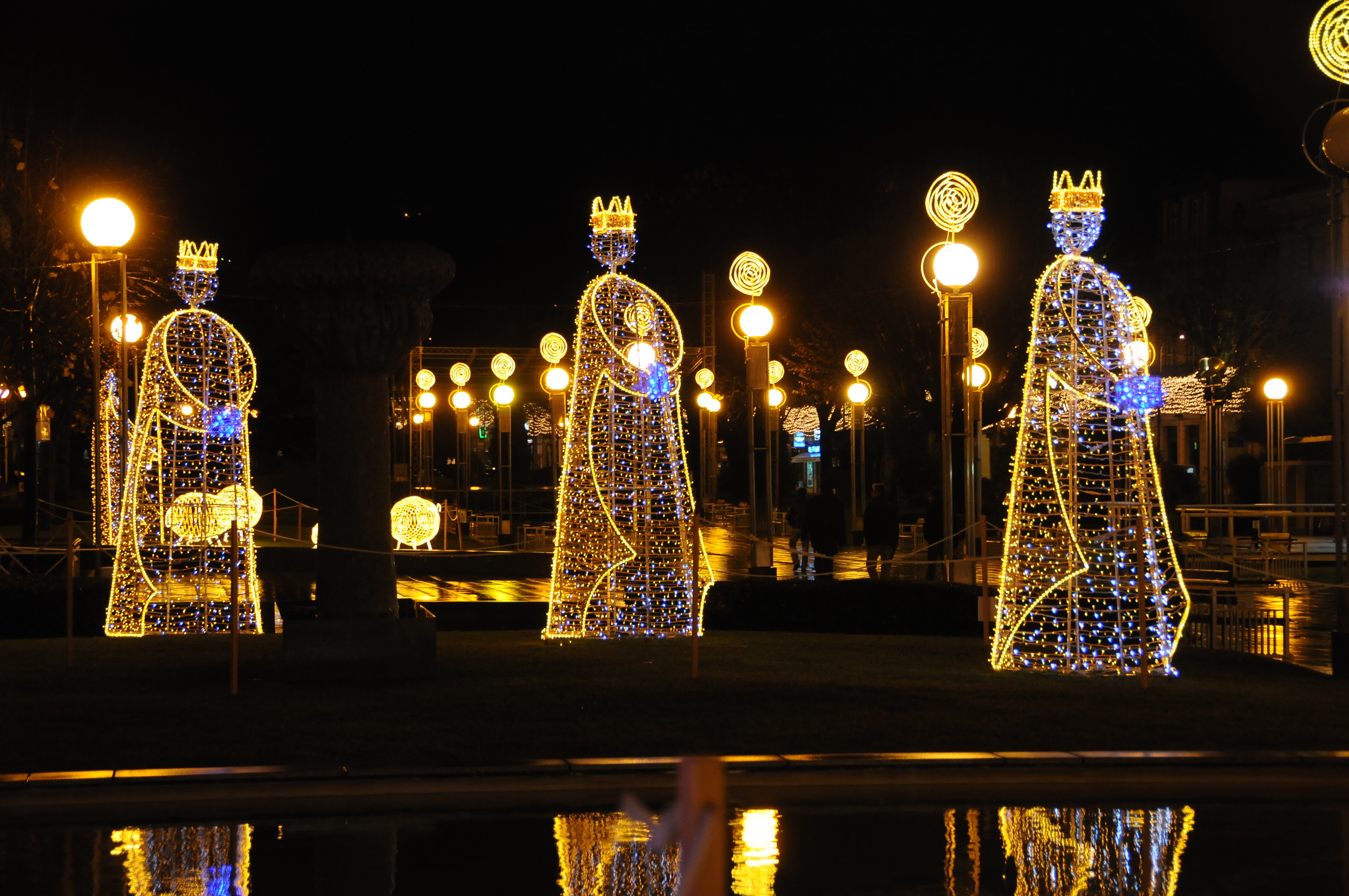
Christmas decorations in Braga

==== Serbia and Montenegro ====
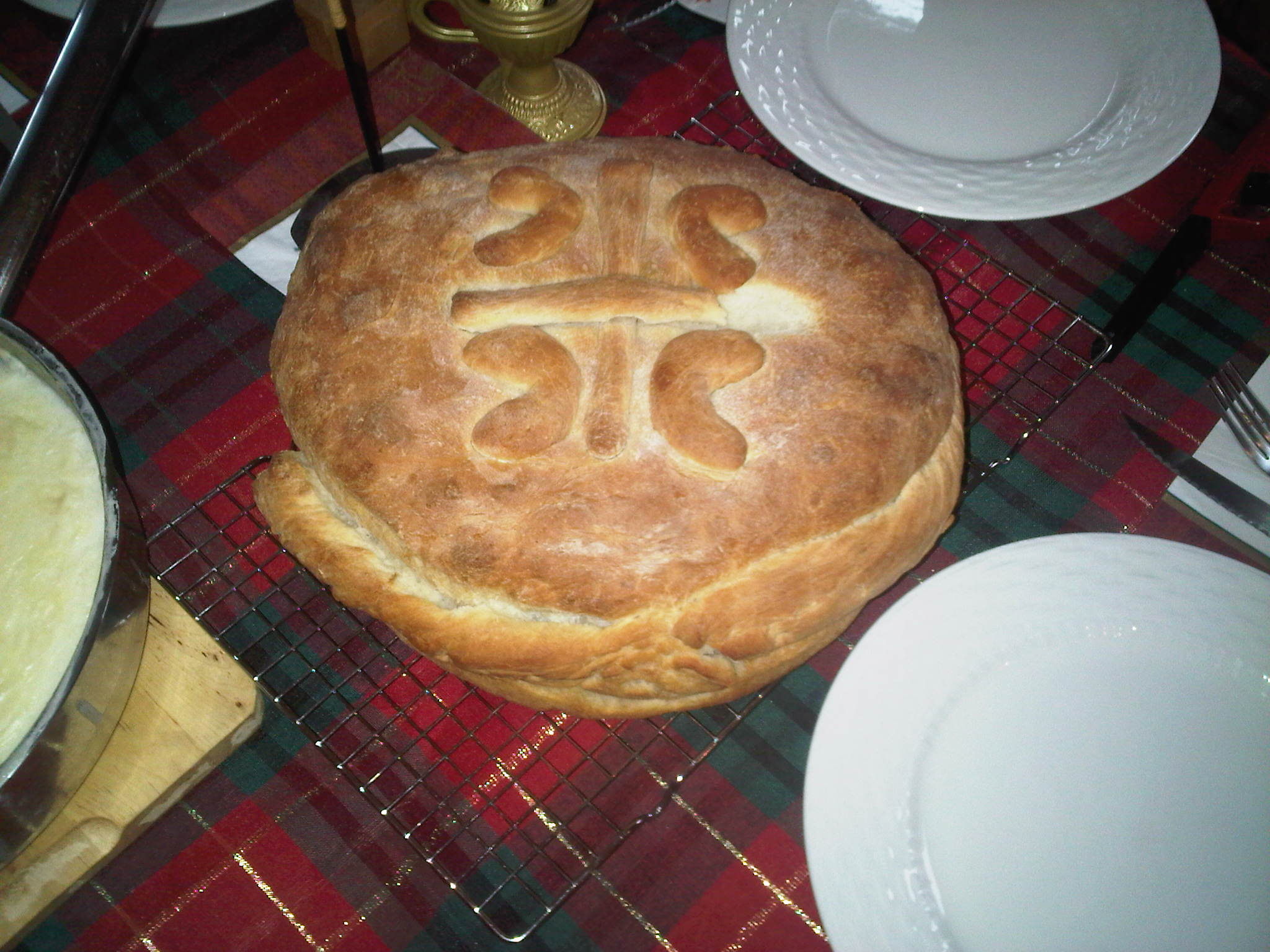
Serbian Orthodox Christmas bread

In Serbia and Montenegro, Christmas (Serbian: Божић, romanized: Božić, pronounced [boʒitɕ] or more formally Рождество Христово, Rozhdestvo Hristovo, 'Nativity of Christ') is celebrated for three consecutive days, beginning with Christmas Day. The Serbian Orthodox Church uses the traditional Julian calendar, per which Christmas Day (25 December) falls on 7 January. This day is called the first day of Christmas, and the following two are accordingly called the second and the third day of Christmas. During this festive time, one is to greet another person with "Christ is Born" (Serbian: Христос се роди, romanized: Hristos se rodi), which should be responded to with "Truly He is Born" (Serbian: Ваистину се роди, romanized: Vaistinu se rodi). The Serbian name for Christmas, Božić, means 'young, little God'.

This holiday surpasses all the others celebrated by Serbs in terms of the diversity of folk customs and rituals observed. These may vary from region to region, with some having modern versions adapted to contemporary ways of living. The ideal environment to carry them out fully is the traditional multi-generation country household.

In the morning of Christmas Eve, a young, straight oak tree is selected and felled by the head of the household. A log is cut from it and is referred to as the badnjak. In the evening, the badnjak is ceremoniously put on the domestic fire that burns in the house's fireplace called ognjište, whose hearth is without a vertical surround. The burning of the badnjak is accompanied by prayers to God so that the coming year may bring much happiness, love, good fortune, riches, and food. Since most houses today have no ognjište on which to burn a badnjak, it is symbolically represented by several leaved oak twigs. For the convenience of city dwellers, they can be bought at marketplaces or received in churches.

The dinner on this day is festive, copious, and diverse in food, although it is prepared in accordance with the rules of fasting. Groups of young people go from house to house in their village or neighborhood, congratulating each other, singing, and performing; this continues for the next three days. The Serbs also take a bundle of straw into the house and spread it over the floor, and then put walnuts on it. Before the table is set for dinner, it is strewn with a thin layer of straw and covered with a white cloth. The head of household makes the Sign of the Cross, lights a candle, and censes the whole house. The family members sit down at the table, but before tucking in they all rise and a man or boy among them says a prayer, or they together sing the troparion of the Nativity. After the dinner, young people visit their friends, a group of whom may gather at the house of one of them. Christmas and other songs are sung, while older adults narrate stories from the olden times.

On Christmas Day, the celebration is announced at dawn by church bells and by shooting. Great importance is placed on the first visit a family receives that day. People expect it to bring prosperity and well-being to their household in the coming year; this visit is often prearranged. Christmas dinner is the most celebratory meal a family has during the year. A special, festive loaf of bread is baked for this occasion. The main course is roast pork, cooked whole by rotating it on a wooden spit near an open fire. Even though gift-giving is not necessarily a part of the tradition, a Santa Claus-like character called Božić Bata (Father Christmas) sometimes takes his part in gift-giving, as Santa Claus is more traditionally connected to New Year's celebrations. Gift-giving is, nevertheless, connected with the celebrations, traditionally taking place on the three consecutive Sundays immediately preceding it. Children, mothers, and fathers, respectively, are the set gift-givers on these three days.

Since the early 1990s, the Serbian Orthodox Church has, together with local communities, organized public celebrations on Christmas Eve. The course of these celebrations can typically be divided into three parts: preparation, ritual, and festivity. The preparation consists of going and cutting down the tree to be used as the badnjak, taking it to the churchyard, and preparing drink and food for the assembled parishioners. The ritual includes Vespers, placing the badnjak on the open fire built in the churchyard, blessing or consecrating the badnjak, and an appropriate program with songs and recitals. In some parishes, they build the fire on which to burn the badnjak not in the churchyard but at some other suitable location in their town or village. The festivity consists of getting together around the fire and socializing. Each celebration has its own specificities that reflect the traditions of the local community and other local factors.

In Serbia, Montenegro, and North Macedonia Christmas is celebrated on 7 January. This is a result of their Orthodox Churches commemorating Christmas Day based on the Julian calendar, which is now 13 days behind the Revised Julian calendar (the other calendar used by certain Eastern Orthodox Churches, which is equivalent to the Gregorian calendar until 2100.)

==== Spain ====
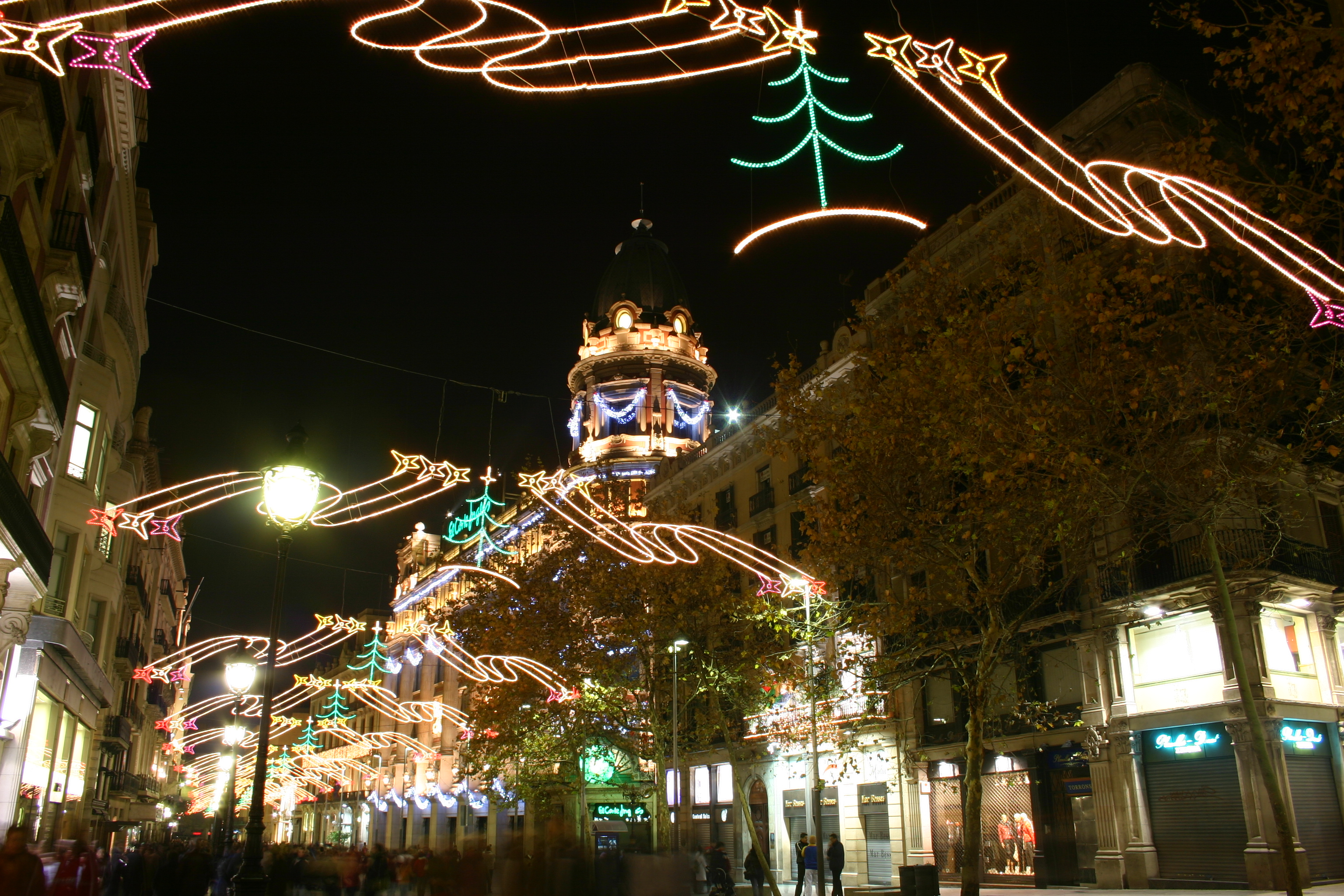
Avinguda Portal de l'Àngel, at Christmas time, Barcelona, Spain

Christmas is an officially recognized holiday in Spain. In most of Spain, the Christmas period (Navidad) lasts from Christmas Eve (Nochebuena, that is, 'Good Night') on 24 December to Epiphany on 6 January. Many homes and most churches display a Nativity scene, a Christmas tree, or both. The belén or pesebre (Nativity scene) has a long tradition and is present in many homes, schools, and stores, while the Christmas tree is not traditional, but it has become very popular. In Catalonia, on the 26th, Sant Esteve (Saint Stephen) is celebrated with a family gathering.

In most of Spain (though not in a few areas, such as Catalonia), a large family dinner is celebrated on Christmas Eve (nochebuena) and can last until late in the night. There is a wide variety of typical foods one might find on plates across Spain on this particular night, and each region has its own distinct specialties. It is particularly common to start the meal with a seafood dish such as prawns or salmon, followed by a bowl of hot, homemade soup. The main meal will often consist of roast lamb, or seafood, such as cod or shellfish. For dessert, there is quite a spread of delicacies, among them turrón, a dessert made of honey, egg, and almonds. Special dishes and desserts include shellfish and fish, marzipan, turkey with truffles, and polvorones (shortbread made of almonds, flour, and sugar).

Even though there is still the traditional Misa del Gallo at midnight, few Spaniards continue to follow the old custom of attending.

In most of Spain, Christmas day was not associated with presents for children until recently; instead, the Three Magi brought the presents on the night of 5 January, as they still do. Now children often receive some presents on Christmas Day or Christmas Eve, brought by Papá Noel ('Father Noel'), which is a non-traditional version of Santa Claus, as depicted in U.S. media, but in some regions, there are other more traditional characters, for example, the Olentzero in the Basque Country.

In the evening of 31 December (Nochevieja) there is also a large family feast. At 12:00 am on January 1, it is a famous tradition in Spain to eat the Twelve Grapes (las doce uvas de la suerte). Young people typically go out to a cotillón, a very big feast in bars and pubs, and they drink and dance until the next morning, when it is common to have churros with chocolate for breakfast.

In the evening of 5 January, a huge public parade or cavalcade (cabalgata de reyes) welcomes the Three Magi in the major cities of Spain. The parades are often televised. Children put their shoes on a balcony or window on the night of 5 January in the hope that the Three Wise Men will deliver them presents.

==== Turkey ====
In Turkey, Christmas is observed mainly by the Eastern Orthodox Christian minority and not the Muslim majority. Though Turkey has no direct link to Christmas, it was home to Saint Nicholas, a 4th-century bishop in Anatolia (then part of the Byzantine Empire) and the inspiration for the folklore of Santa Claus.

=== Western Europe ===
==== France and other French-speaking areas ====
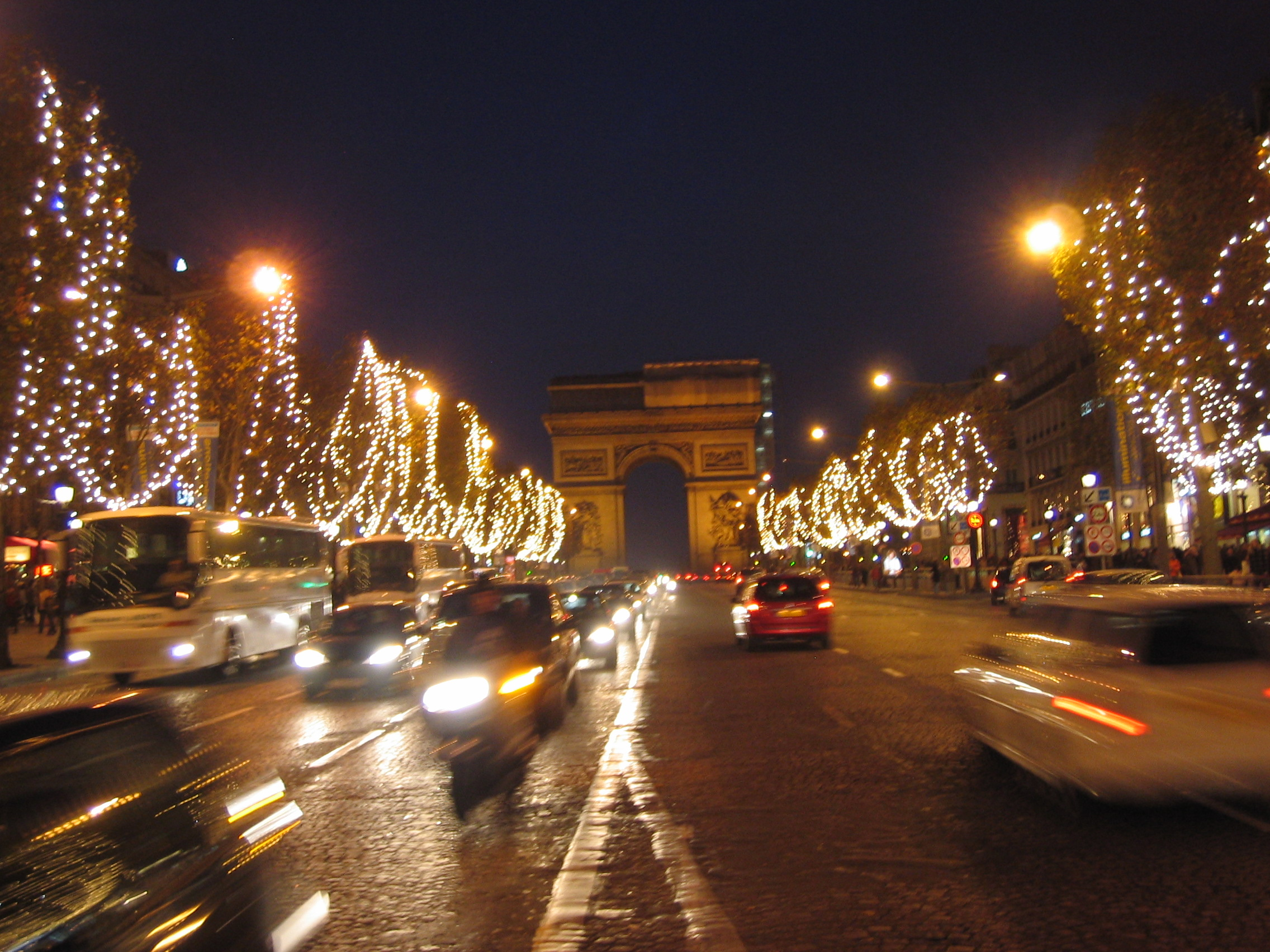
Christmas decorations along the Champs-Élysées in Paris, France

Christmas in France (Noël on the French calendar) is celebrated mainly in a religious manner, though secular ways of celebrating the occasion also exist, such as Christmas decorations and carols.

In France and in other French-speaking areas (see also Canada section), a long family dinner, called a réveillon, is held on Christmas Eve. The name of this dinner is based on the word réveil (meaning 'waking'), because participation involves staying awake until midnight and beyond.

In Belgium, the monarch gives a televised speech to the nation on New Year's Eve, in which the year's national and international events are addressed, usually ending with a message of hope.

==== United Kingdom ====
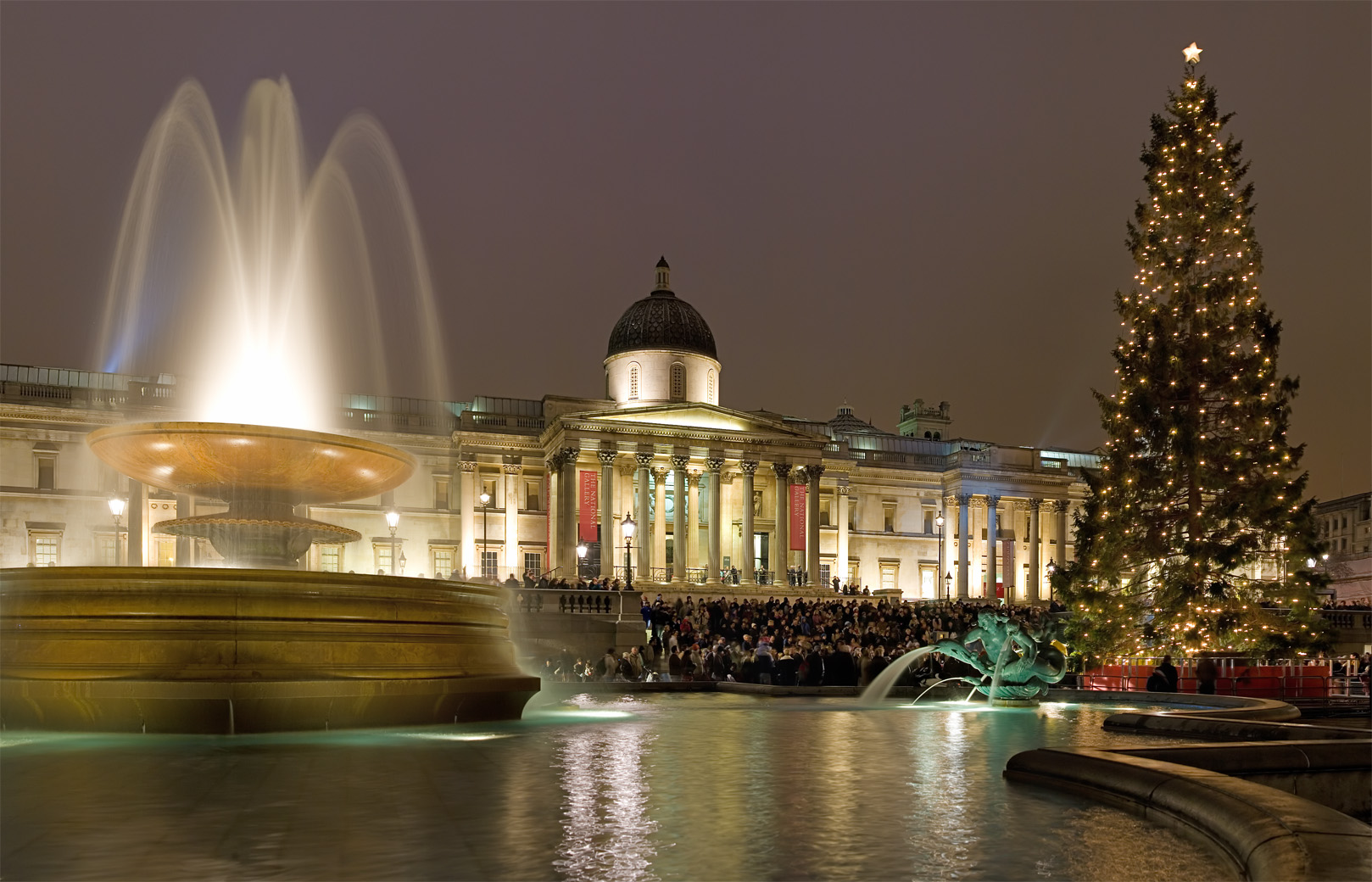
Christmas tree and carolers at Trafalgar Square in London

Mince pies are traditionally sold during the festive season and are a popular food for Christmas. It is common in many UK households for children and adults to put up Advent calendars in their homes, which may either contain chocolates or Christmas scenes behind their doors.

On Christmas Eve, presents are supposedly delivered in stockings.

The Royal family opens its gifts on Christmas Eve, following German tradition introduced by the Hanoverians. Queen Victoria as a child made note of it in her diary for Christmas Eve 1832; the delighted 13-year-old princess wrote, "After dinner ... we then went into the drawing-room near the dining-room ... There were two large round tables on which were placed two trees hung with lights and sugar ornaments. All the presents being placed round the trees..". Since the first commercial Christmas card was produced in London in 1843, cards have been sent in the weeks leading up to Christmas, many of which contain the English festive greeting Merry Christmas.

On Christmas Day, a public holiday in the United Kingdom, nearly the whole population has the day off to be with their family and friends, so they can gather round for a traditional Christmas dinner, traditionally comprising a turkey with cranberries, brussels sprouts, parsnips, Yorkshire pudding and roast potatoes, quite like the Sunday roast, and followed by a Christmas pudding. During the meal, Christmas crackers, containing toys, jokes, and a paper hat are pulled. Attendance at a Christmas Day church service has become less popular in modern times, with fewer than 3 million now attending a Christmas Day Church of England service.

Television is widely watched. The monarch releases a royal message on Christmas Day, in the form of a short programme carried on radio and television. The messages typically reflect on topics such as the year's events, the state of the royal family, and themes such as unity. The message averages seven million viewers, and is often one of the most-watched programmes of the day on Christmas. The monarch's speech, writes J.M. Golby and A.W. Purdue, has "come to represent the unity of the nation at Christmas time".

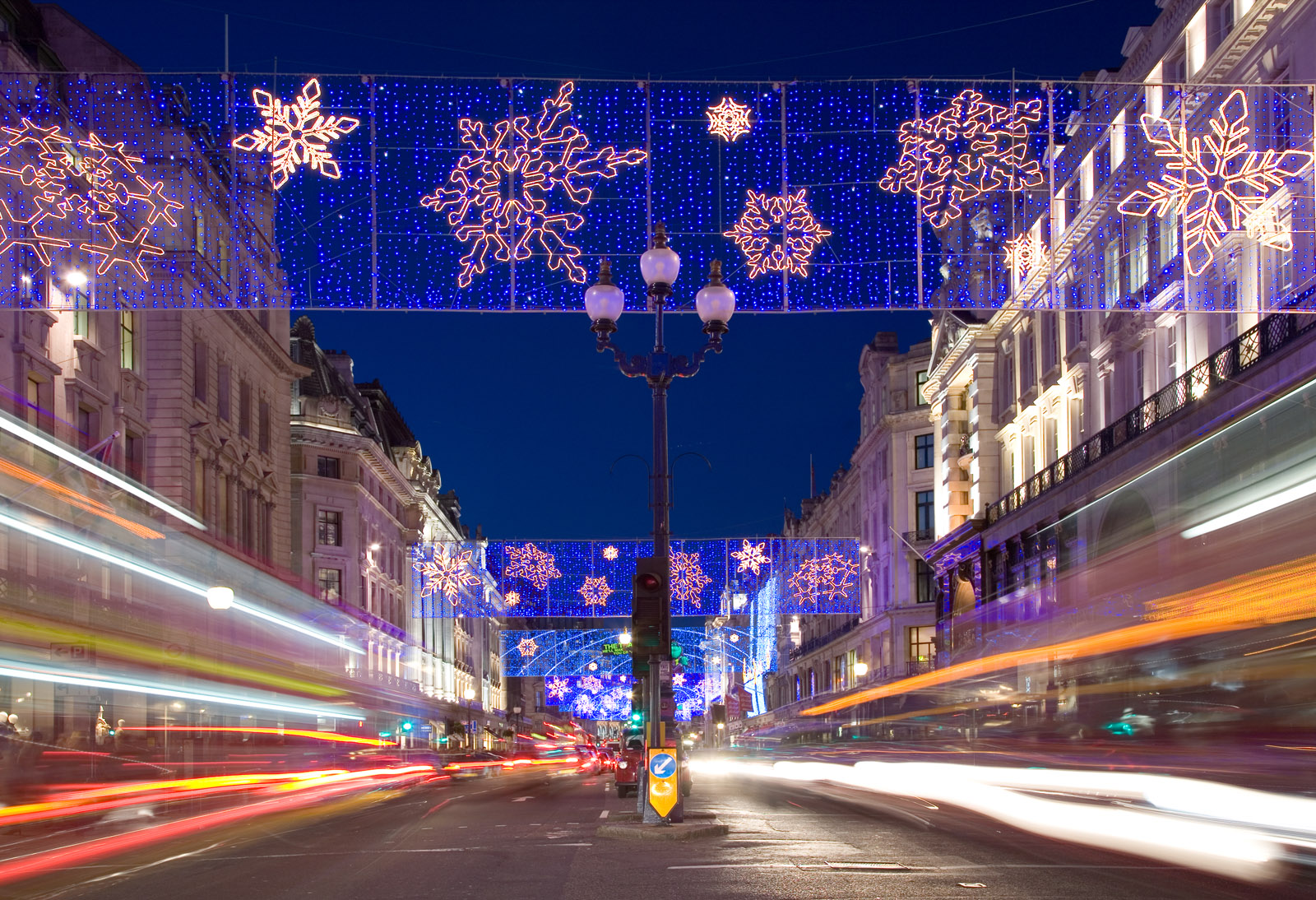
Christmas lights on Regent Street, London

Top-level football competitions such as the Premier League have traditionally held fixtures on Boxing Day.

Public transport and vital transport services are closed-down on Christmas Day. The Christmas wind-down starts early, with last trains running out of the major cities as early as 19:00 on 24 December. Bus, night bus, and underground services are also unavailable from about 21:00 hours. Individual transport companies start making announcements as early as October, and while one train operating company may choose to run no trains on Boxing Day another may run a limited Saturday service but totally close major stations.

===== England =====
In England, telling ghost stories, local legends, and other strange, bizarre, and fantastic "winter stories" (as Charles Dickens – author of A Christmas Carol – termed them) was a centuries-old tradition, to which William Shakespeare contributed with The Winter's Tale (1623) but which was well known even before Shakespeare's time. (In contrast, Ireland, Scotland, and the USA favour Halloween as a time for telling ghostly tales.) Colin Fleming details other contributors to this tradition in the Paris Review.

===== Wales =====
Wales has a tradition of singing caneuon plygain, which is done on the week before Christmas Day. In addition, the tradition of Noson Gyflaith (Toffee Evening) used to be participated mainly in North Wales. This is where people gathered to play games, tell stories, and create toffee by taking turns pulling the confectionery slabs to make strands.

===== Scotland =====
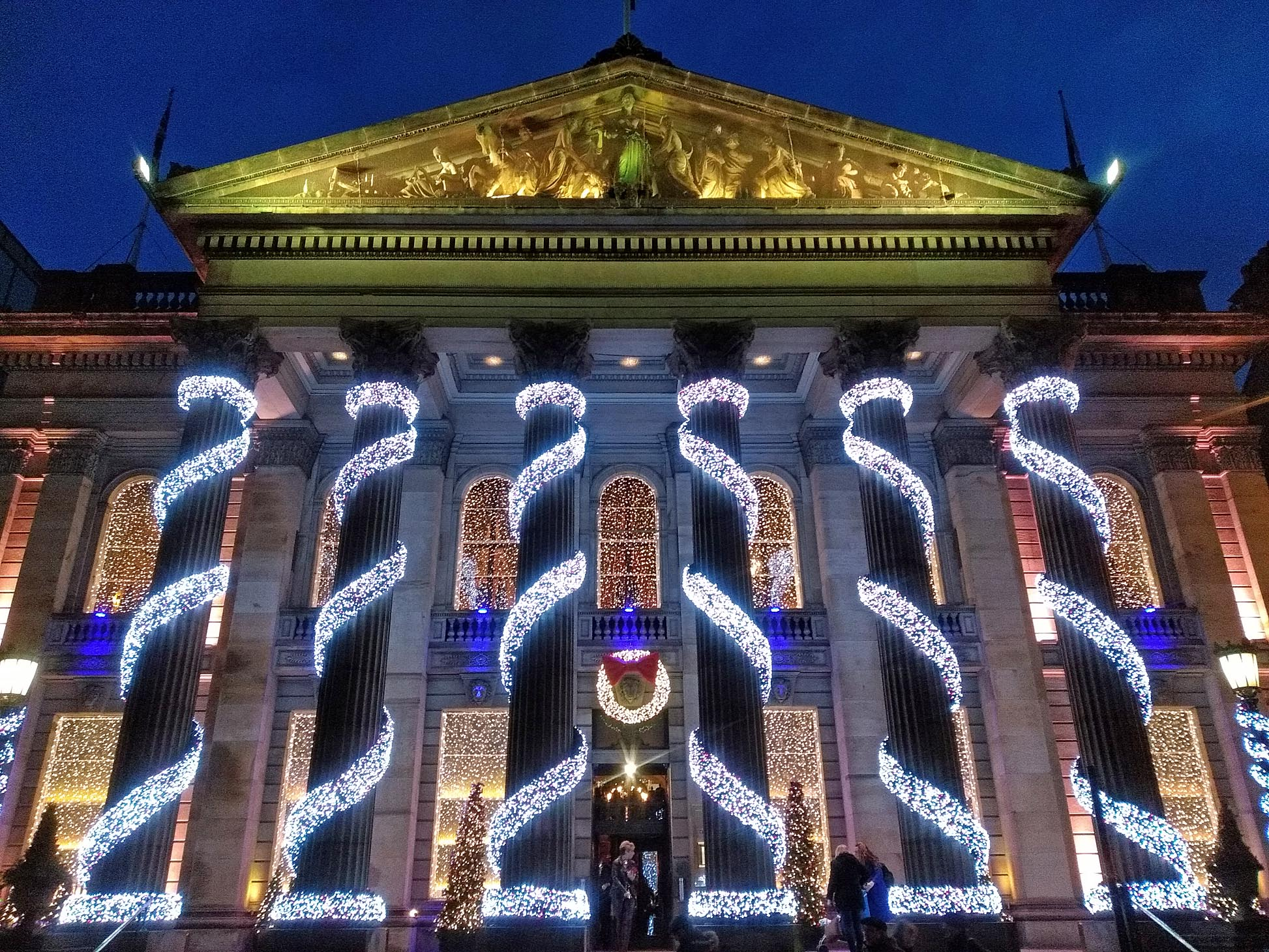
Christmas lights displayed at The Dome, Edinburgh

Christmas in Scotland was traditionally observed very quietly, because the Church of Scotland never placed much emphasis on the Christmas festival. In Catholic areas, people would attend midnight or early-morning mass before going to work. This tradition derives from the Church of Scotland's origins including St Columba's monastic tradition, under which every day is God's day and there is none more special than another; thus Good Friday is not an official public holiday in Scotland. Christmas Day was commonly a normal working day in Scotland until the 1960s, and even into the 1970s in some areas. The New Year's Eve festivity, Hogmanay, was by far the largest celebration in Scotland. The gift-giving, public holidays, and feasting associated with mid-winter were traditionally held between 11 December and 6 January. Since the 1980s, the fading of the Church's influence and the growing influence of the rest of the UK and beyond have meant that Christmas and its related festivities have surpassed Hogmanay and New Year's Day. The capital city of Edinburgh now has a traditional German Christmas market from late November until Christmas Eve. Bannock cakes made of oatmeal are traditionally eaten at Christmas.

==== Ireland ====
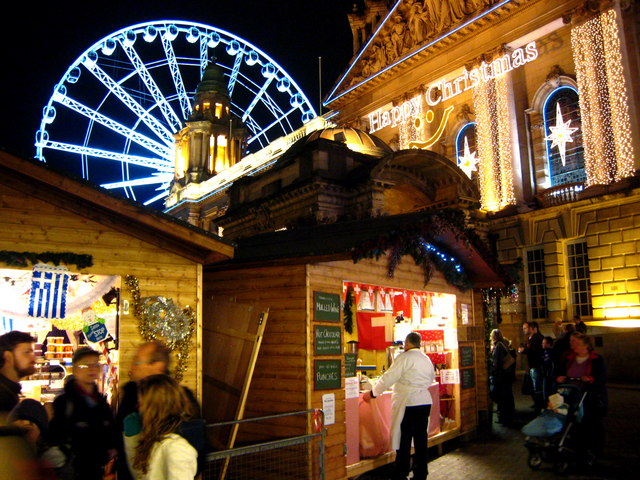
Christmas market

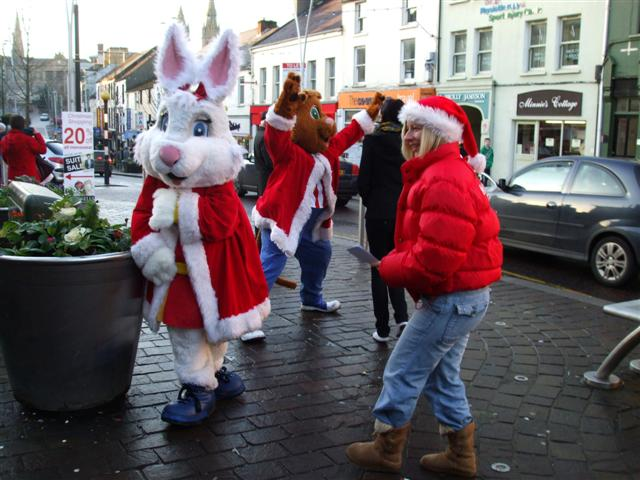
Christmas high jinks, Omagh

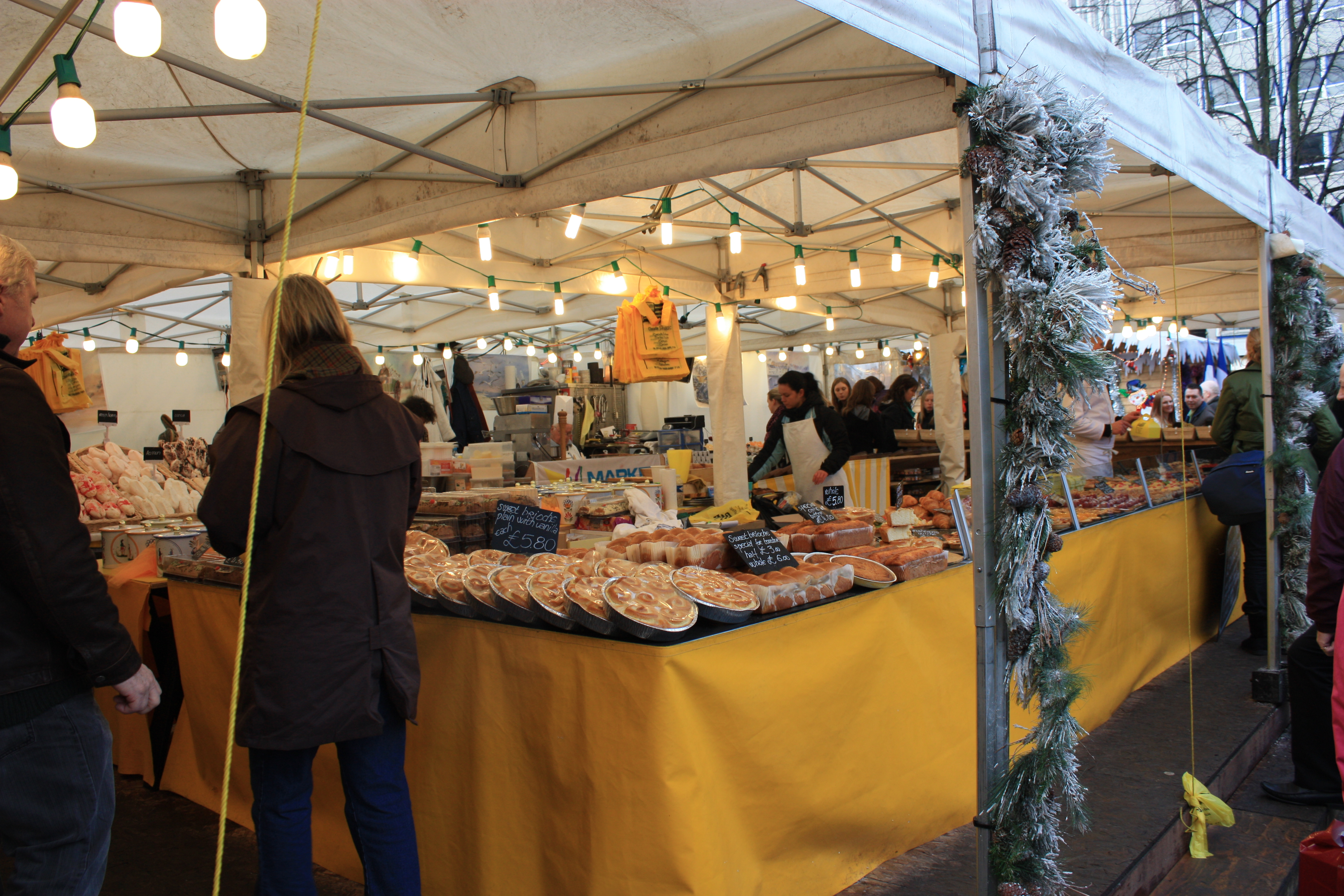
Christmas market

In 2006, the total amount spent in Ireland to celebrate Christmas was €16 billion, which averages at approximately €4,000 for every single person in the country.

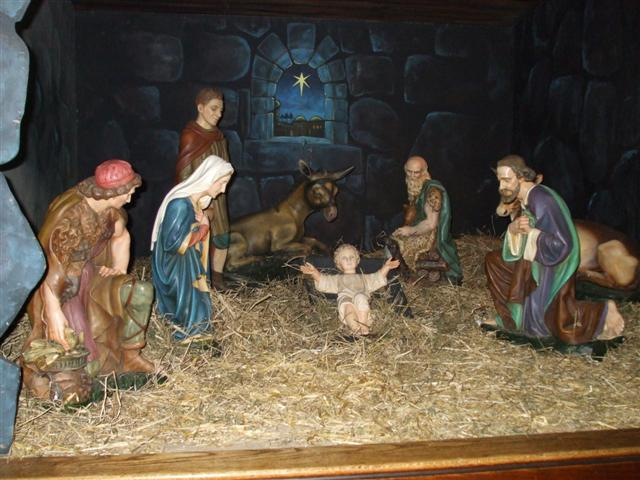
Church nativity scene

It is traditional to decorate graves at Christmas with a wreath made of holly and ivy. Even in the most secular homes in Ireland, the traditional crib takes center stage alongside the Christmas tree as part of the family's decorations. Some people light candles to symbolize hospitality to Mary and Joseph. Therefore, it is common to see a white candle or candle set placed in several windows around people's homes. The candle was a way of saying there was room for Jesus's parents in these homes even if there was none in Bethlehem.

==== Netherlands and Flanders ====
Christmas traditions in the Netherlands are almost the same as those in Dutch-speaking parts of Belgium (Flanders). The Netherlands recognizes two days of Christmas as public holidays, calling 25 December eerste kerstdag ('first Christmas day') and 26 December tweede kerstdag ('second Christmas day').

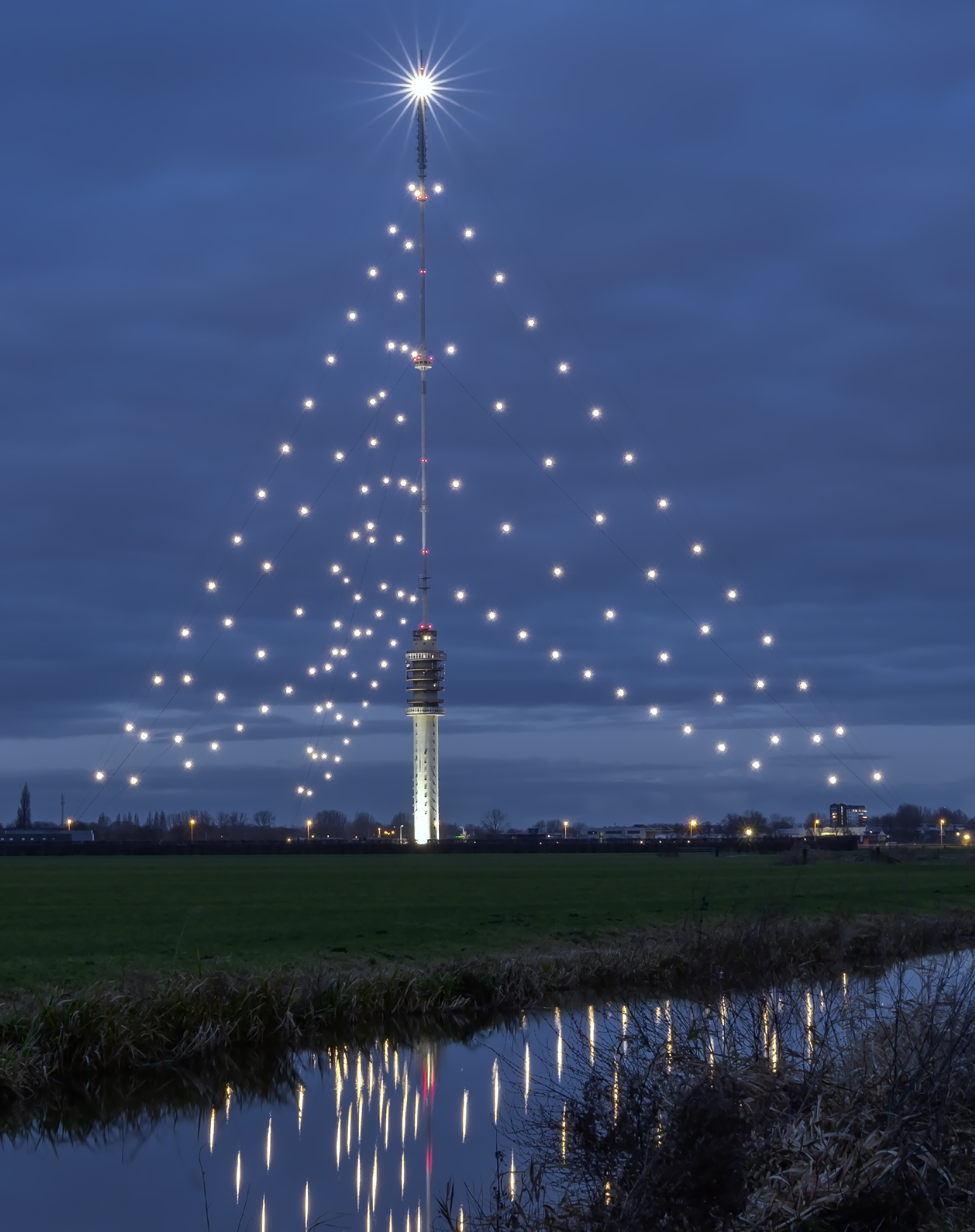
A TV tower in the Netherlands as a giant Christmas tree

== Oceania ==
=== Australia ===
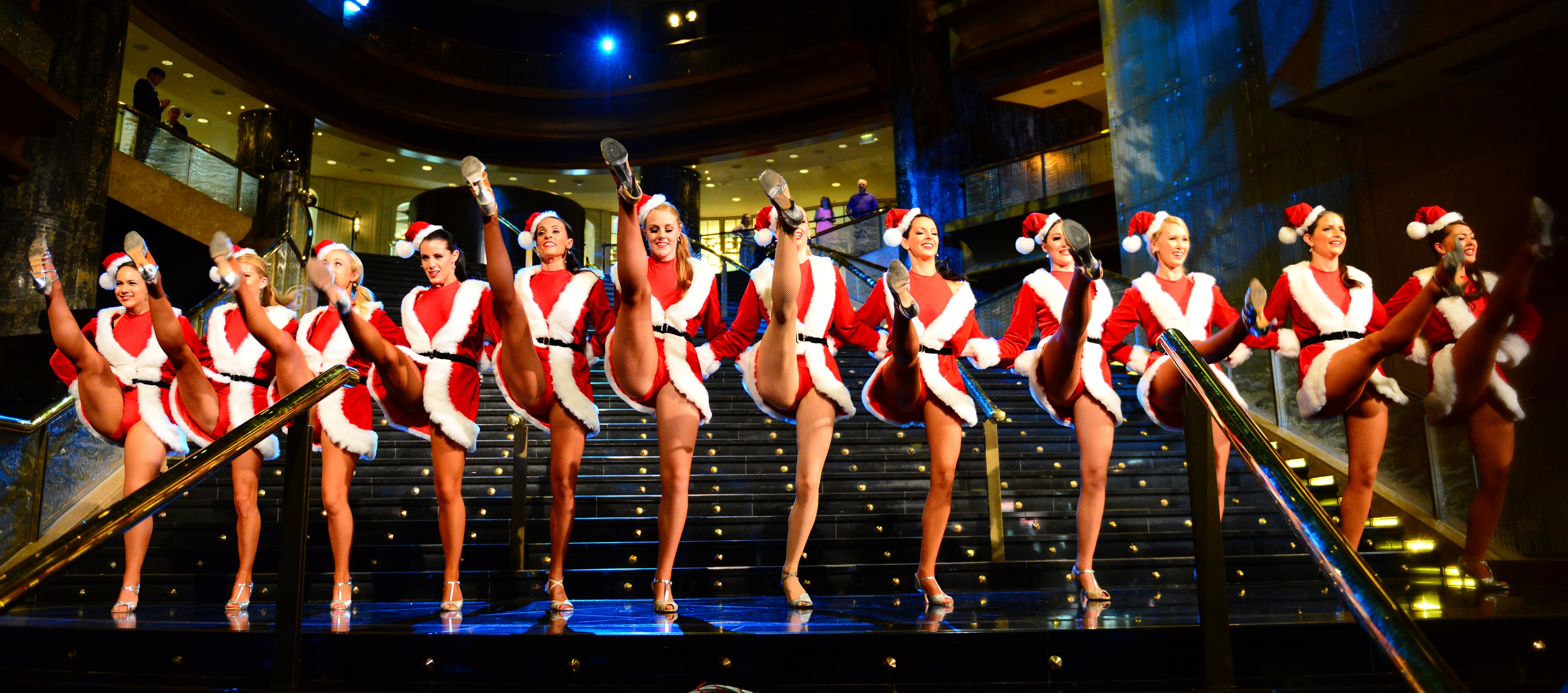
The Christmas Belles performing at Melbourne Crown atrium

There have been depictions of Christmas traditions tailored to Australian iconography, such as Santa partaking in activities such as surfing (in 2015, a world record was set on Bondi Beach for the world's largest surf lesson, featuring 320 participants in Santa suits), parodies of traditional carols, and original songs such as Rolf Harris's Six White Boomers (which depicts Santa Claus as using a ute pulled by kangaroos instead of reindeer and a sleigh).

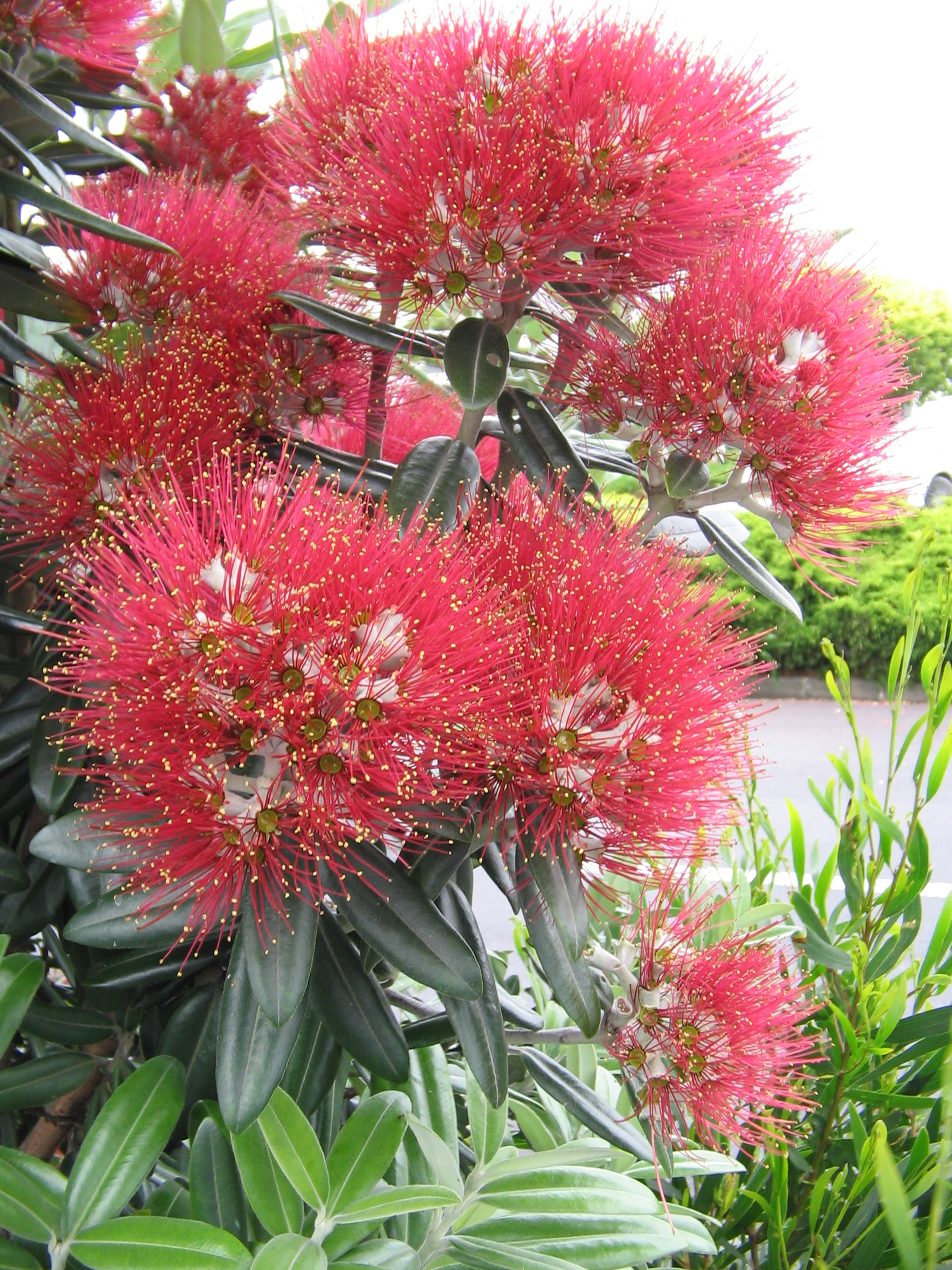
The December-flowering pohutukawa (Metrosideros excelsa), an often-used Christmas symbol in New Zealand

A notable Christmas event in Australia is Carols by Candlelight—an annual concert and charity appeal benefiting the charity Vision Australia.

Due to Christmas taking place in summer, Australia has celebrations in July, known as Christmas in July. However, it is not as celebrated as the traditional Christmas. It can be seen being referenced in advertising.

=== New Zealand ===
Christmas Day and Boxing Day are both statutory holidays in New Zealand. While Boxing Day is a standard statutory holiday, Christmas Day is one of the three-and-a-half days of the year when all but the most essential businesses and services must close. Many of New Zealand's Christmas traditions are similar to those of Australia in that they are a mix of United Kingdom and North American traditions conducted in summer. New Zealand celebrates Christmas with very little traditional Northern Hemisphere winter imagery. The pohutukawa (Metrosideros excelsa), which produces large crimson flowers in December, is an often used symbol for Christmas in New Zealand, and subsequently the pohutukawa has become known as the New Zealand Christmas tree.
