= Soča Reggae Riversplash =

- Genre: Reggae
- Locations: Tolmin, Slovenia
- Years active: 2000-present
- Website: Soca Reggae Riversplash

Soča Reggae Riversplash was a music festival in Tolmin, Slovenia at the confluence of the Soča and the Tolminka rivers. It mainly features reggae music by international musicians.

== 1st Soča Reggae Riversplash 2000 (July 13–15), Tolmin (confluence) ==
New Born Creation (The Netherlands)

== 4th Soča Reggae Riversplash 2003 (July 10–13), Tolmin (confluence) ==
- Zion Train (United Kingdom)
- B.R. Stylers (Italy)
- Dubblestandart (Austria)
- Radical Dub Kolektiv (Croatia)
- Mikey Dread (Jamaica)
- Gentleman (Germany)
- Terrakota (Portugal)
- Irie Vibes (Slovenia)
- Sly Asher & The Rooters (France)
- Del Arno Band (Serbia & Montenegro)
- Sista (United Kingdom)
- Benjamin Zephaniah & Sista (United Kingdom)
- Djambi (Brazil)
- Eyesburn (Serbia and Montenegro)
- Superhiks (Republic of Macedonia)
- Paprika Korps (Poland)
- Red Five Point Star (Slovenia)

== 5th Soča Reggae Riversplash 2004 (July 15–18), Tolmin (confluence) ==
- Brain Holidays (Croatia)
- Siti hlapci (Slovenia)
- Headcornerstone (Germany)
- Culture feat. Joseph Hill
- The Pokerheads (Slovenia)
- HUMb (Belgium)
- Go Lem System (Argentina / Spain)
- Natural Black (Jamaica)
- Artikal Crew (France)
- R.A.S.M.C. & Mutant Dance (Serbia and Montenegro)
- Fake Orchestra (Slovenia)
- Djambi (Brasil)
- Julian Marley & The Uprising (Jamaica)
- Dub Rebellion (Bosnia and Hercegovina / Jamaica)
- Dubital & Bomba Bomba (Italy)
- Dubians (France)
- B.R. Stylers (Italy)
- Prince Alla (Jamaica)

== See also ==
- List of reggae festivals
- Reggae
