= List of reggae festivals =

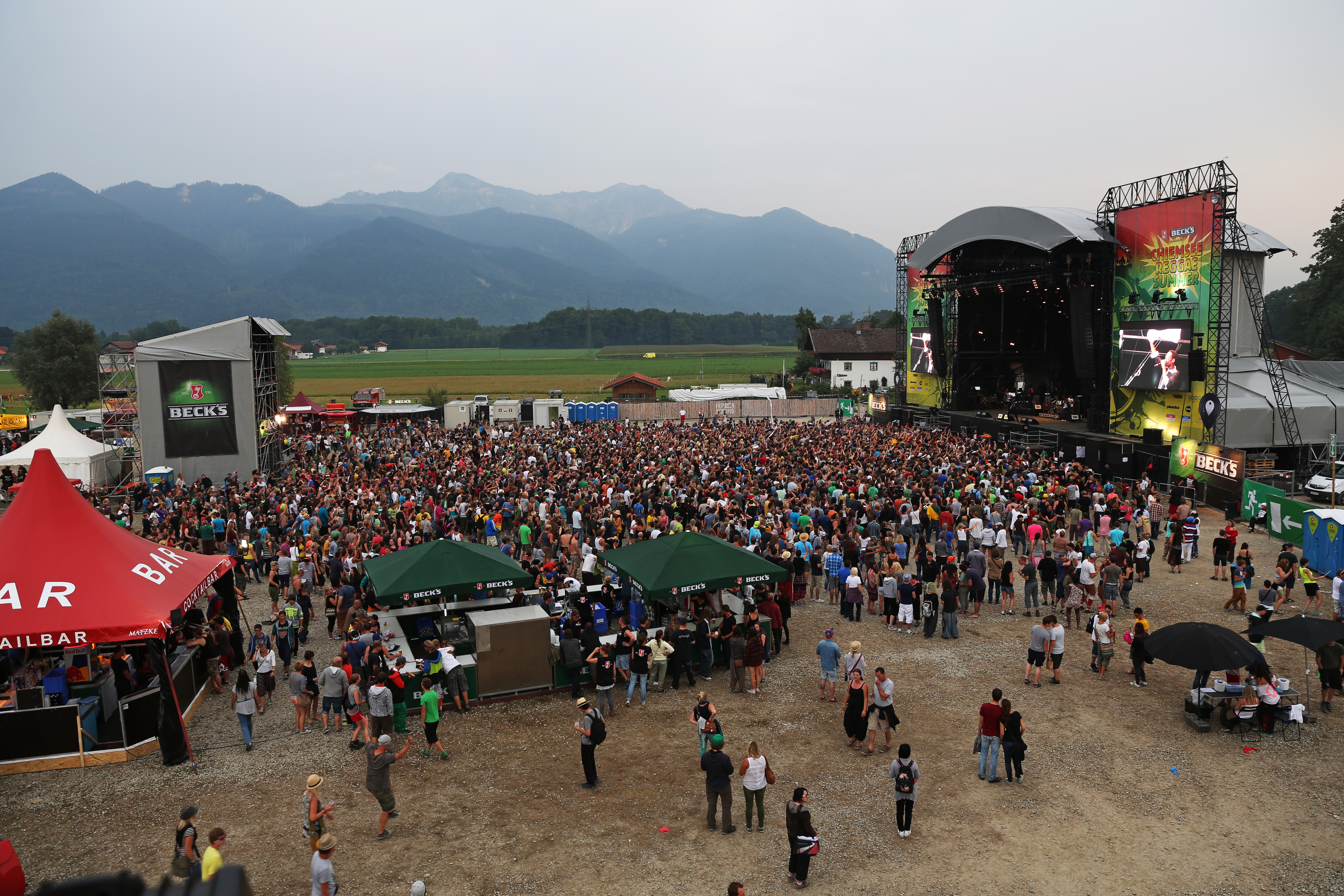

General Information
- Related genres: Reggae, roots reggae, reggae rock, jazz, ska, dancehall, dub, hip-hop, ragga, reggae fusion
- Location: Jamaica (origin), worldwide
- Related events: Category:Reggae festivals, list of music festivals, free festival, rock festival, electronic music festival, jam band festival

This is a list of notable reggae festivals by country.

This list may have some overlap with list of jam band music festivals. Reggae festivals may include classic reggae and related or derivative genres such as ska, dancehall, dub, hip-hop, ragga, reggae fusion, and drum and bass.

Reggae originated in Jamaica in the late 1960s, influenced by Rastafarian culture, Jamaican dance music, traditional mento and calypso music, as well as American jazz and rhythm and blues, and evolved out of the earlier genres ska and rocksteady. By the 1970s, large festivals in Jamaica were being held featuring notable reggae bands, and the Wonder Dream Concert in 1975 in Jamaica was one of the first internationally noted festivals to focus on reggae. In 1979, Reggae Geel became the first reggae festival in Europe, and these concerts soon spread to other locales, becoming popular in regions such as Northern California. With the introduction of the electronic reggae genre ragga in the 1980s, reggae began to be featured at electronic music festivals as well.

== Festivals by region ==
=== Africa ===
==== Gambia West Africa ====
- Gambia Cultural Reggae Festival The Hamlet, Gunjur, Medina Salam

==== South Africa ====
- Reggae Ark Festival, Mamelodi, Pretoria

==== Mauritius ====
- Festival Reggae Donn Sa

==== Nigerian ====
- Roaring thunder concert

==== Kenya ====
- Shashamane International
- Sepetuka
- Reggae In the Sun
- Royal Reggae Fest

==== Mozambique ====
- Maputo Reggae Slam

==== Uganda ====
- Reggae on the Nile

=== North America ===
==== Antigua ====
- Reggae in the Park, Nelson's Dockyard, English Harbour

==== Barbados ====
- The Barbados Reggae Festival

==== Canada ====
- Calgary International Reggae Festival, Calgary, Alberta
- Montreal International Reggae Festival, Montreal, Quebec
- Ottawa Reggae Festival, Ottawa
- Victoria Ska Festival, Victoria, British Columbia
- Toronto's Caribana, Toronto, Ontario
- Afrofest, Toronto, Ontario

==== Mexico ====
- Baja Beach Fest, Baja California, Mexico
- Skatex, Texcoco, Estado de México

==== United States ====
- California Roots Music and Arts Festival, Monterey, California ("Cali Roots")
- Cali Vibes, Marina Green Park, Long Beach, California
- Chicago Reggae Festival, Chicago, Illinois
- JazzReggae Festival @ UCLA, Los Angeles, California
- Midwest Reggae Festival, Nelson, Ohio
- Reggae on the River, Humboldt County, California
- Reggae Rising, Humboldt County, California
- Reggae Rise Up, Saint Petersburg, Florida, Las Vegas, Nevada, Phoenix, Arizona and Baltimore, Maryland
- Reggae on the Way, Tacoma, Washington
- Reggae in the Rockies, Alpine, Wyoming

=== Oceania ===
==== Australia ====
- East Coast Blues & Roots Music Festival, Byron Bay
- Raggamuffin Music Festival, also held in New Zealand

==== New Zealand ====
One Love, Tauranga

=== South America ===
==== Paraguay ====
- Reggae Fest, Rakiura Complex, Luque

==== Brazil ====
- Maranhão Roots Reggae Festival, São Luís, Maranhão
- República do Reggae, Salvador, Bahia
- Juriti Rasta, Limoeiro do Norte, Ceará

=== Asia ===
==== India ====
- Goa Sunsplash, Goa

==== Japan ====
- Yokohama Reggae sai, Yokohama
- Shibuya Reggae sai, Tokyo
- HIGHEST MOUNTAIN, Osaka

==== Korea ====
- Rise Again, Seoul

==== Philippines ====
- Bob Marley Fest, Cebu
- Boracay Reggae Festival, Boracay
- Fête de la Musique, Manila/international
- Kadayawan Roots, Arts and Reggae Festival, Davao
- Manila Reggae Summit, Manila
- Puerto Galera Reggae Festival, Puerto Galera
- SunSplash Pilipinas!, Manila

==== Sri Lanka ====
- Rock meets Reggae, Colombo

=== Europe ===
==== Austria ====
- Rise & Shine Festival, Falkenstein

==== Belgium ====
- Reggae Geel, Geel
- Wadada Festival, Geel
- Dubyard, Landen
- Irie Vibes Roots Festival, Kortemark
- Bomboclat Festival, Zeebrugge
- Humble Festival, Wijtschate

==== Bosnia and Herzegovina ====
- Una Riversplash, Bihać

==== Bulgaria ====
- Big Big Summer Reggae Party

==== Croatia ====
- Seasplash, Pula

==== Cyprus ====
- Reggae Sunjam

==== Czech Republic ====
- GoodTown Reggae & Dub Festival
- Mighty Sounds
- Real Beat Festival
- Urban Rapublic

==== Denmark ====
- Silkeborg Reggae Festival, Silkeborg

==== France ====
- Garance Reggae Festival, Bagnols-Sur-Cèze
- No Logo Festival
- Reggae Sun Ska, Pauillac
- Verjux Saone System, Verjux
- Ida y vuelta - festival, Perpignan
- LA FEE ESTIVAL - festival, Chatelneuf Jura

==== Germany ====
- Afrika Karibik Festival, Aschaffenburg
- Reggaejam, Bersenbrück
- Ruhr Reggae Summer, Mülheim/Dortmund
- Splash!
- Summerjam, Cologne
- Chiemsee Summer, Übersee/ Grabenstätt
- Black Forest On Fire, Berghaupten
- Reggae im Herzen Open Air, Radolfzell am Bodensee
- Reggae in Wulf, Wulfertshausen

==== Hungary ====
- LB27 Reggae Camp

==== Italy ====
- Bababoom, Fermo
- Castello Reggae, Alvito
- Gusto Dopa Al Sole, Salento
- One Love World Reggae Festival, Lignano Sabbiadoro
- Meridional Reggae Reunion, Metaponton
- MedioJamaicano Reggae Festival, Pabillonis
- Positive River Festival, Mezzani
- Reggae Train Sun Fest, Catanzaro
- Rora Roots and Culture Fest, Rorà
- Salento Summer Festival, Salento
- Sardinia Reggae, Nulvi
- Sikula Reggae Festival, Rosolini
- Venice Sunsplash, Venice
- Zion Station Festival, Ferrara
- Dubstone, Cilento
- Manuel Dub, Sicilia

==== Montenegro ====
- MontenegroSun ReggaeFest, Petrovac, Budva

==== The Netherlands ====
- Reggae Rotterdam Festival, Rotterdam
- Reggae Lake Festival, Amsterdam
- Reggae Sundance, Eersel
- Two Sevens Splash, Amsterdam
- Rastaplas, Zoetermeer

==== Poland ====
- Afryka, Toruń
- Bass Camp, Rudawka Rymanowska
- Ostróda Reggae Festiwal, Ostróda
- Reggae & Dub Festiwal, Bielawa
- Reggaeland, Płock
- Stolica Reggae Festiwal, Kluczbork
- Winter Reggae, Silesia
- Independent Dub Day, Wrocław

==== Portugal ====
- HIM DUB Festival, Rapoula do Côa
- Boa Onda Reggae Festival, Mafra

==== Serbia ====
- Reggae Serbia Fest, Pančevo

==== Slovakia ====
- Uprising, Bratislava

==== Slovenia ====
- Overjam, Tolmin
- Soča Reggae Riversplash
- Roots in the woods festival, Trije Kralji

==== Spain ====
- Rototom Sunsplash, Bénicassim
- Reggaeboa Festival, Balboa
- Lagata Regge Festival, Zaragoza
- La Concha Reggae Festival, Cantabria
- Nowa Reggae, Barcelona
- IDG, Barcelona
- Bless Festival, Galicia
- Dub Yard Festival, Galicia

==== Sweden ====
- Bob Marley minneskonsert, Skärblacka
- Öland Roots, Öland
- Uppsala Reggae Festival, Uppsala

==== Switzerland ====
- Plein-les-Watts Festival Geneva, GE
- Pachamama Connexion Festival, Lancy, GE
- Lakesplash, Twann, BE
- Reeds Reggae Festival, Pfäffikon, ZH
- Enter the Dancehall Festival, Rote Fabrik, ZH

==== Turkey ====
- Unite in Paradise Reggae Festival, Olympos

==== United Kingdom ====
- Notting Hill Carnival, London, England
- One Love Festival, Essex, England
- Positive Vibration, Liverpool, England
- Reggae Land, Milton Keynes, England
- Simmer Down Festival, Birmingham, England

=== Middle East ===
==== Israel ====
- Reggae In The Desert, Ramat HaNegev Regional Council

==== Lebanon ====
- Kul=Cha Reggae Festival, Amsheet

== Gallery ==
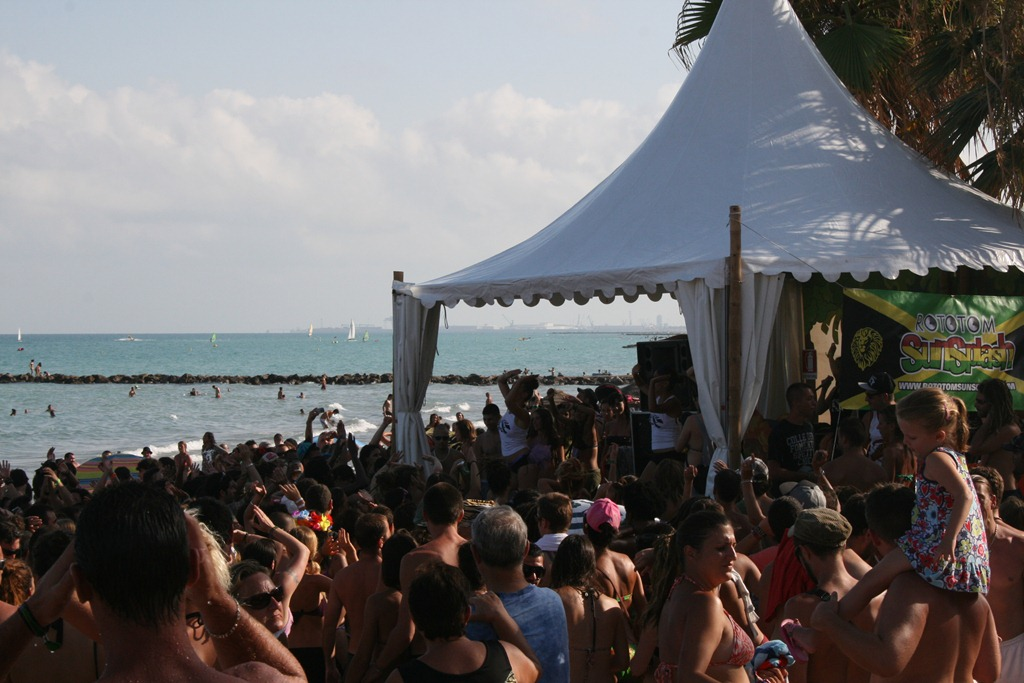
Sunsplash festival 2012

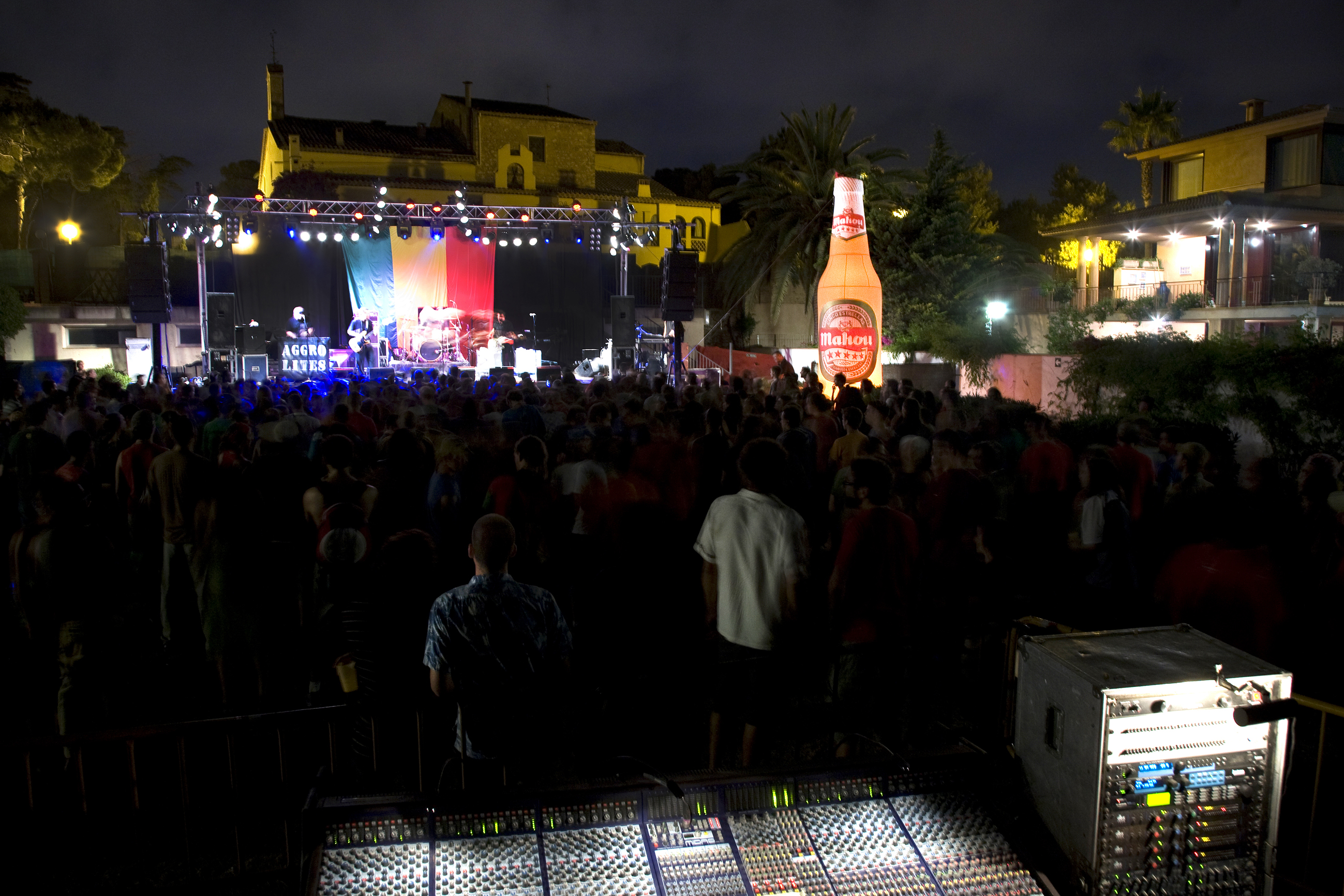
Nowa Reggae

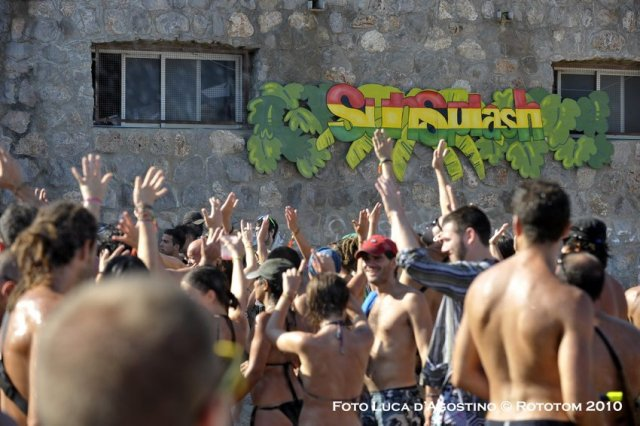
Sunbeach

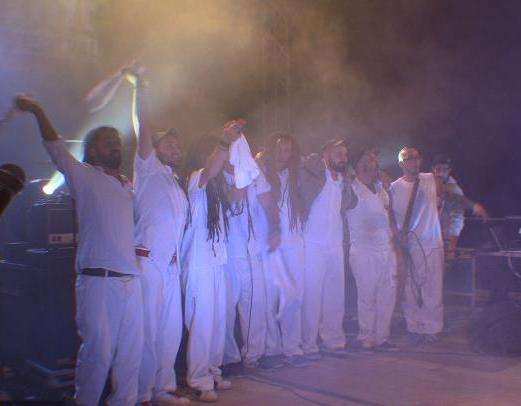
Train to Roots live

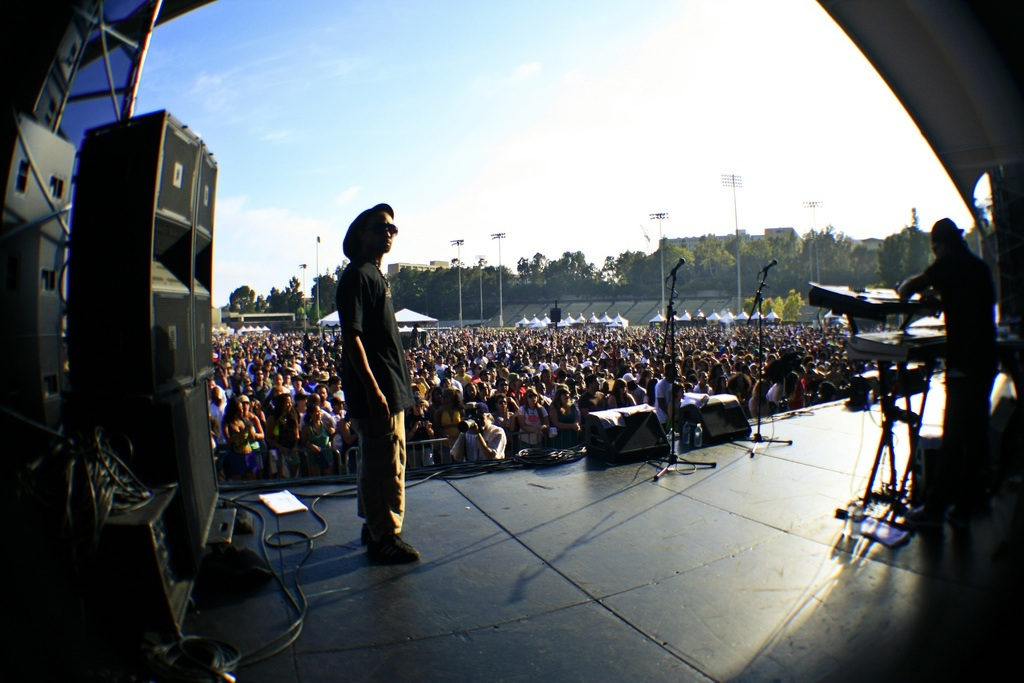

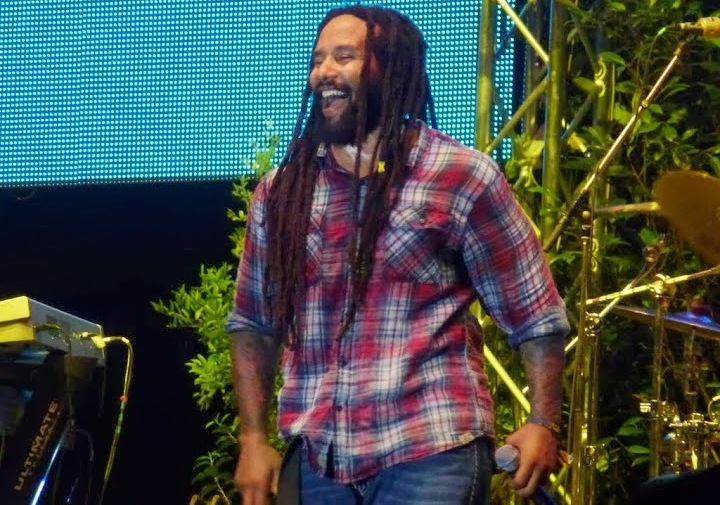
Ky-mani Marley

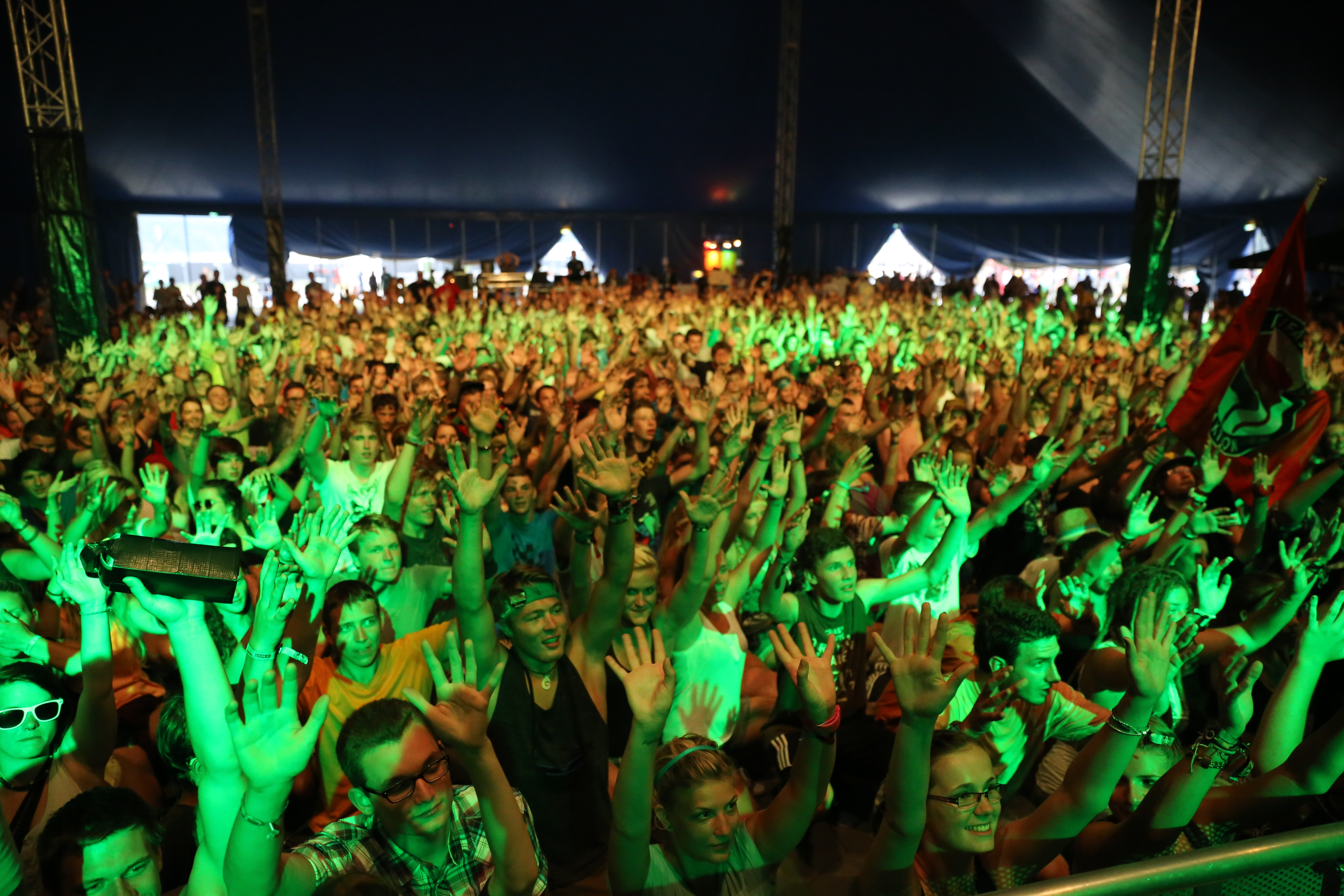
Chiemsee Reggae Summer

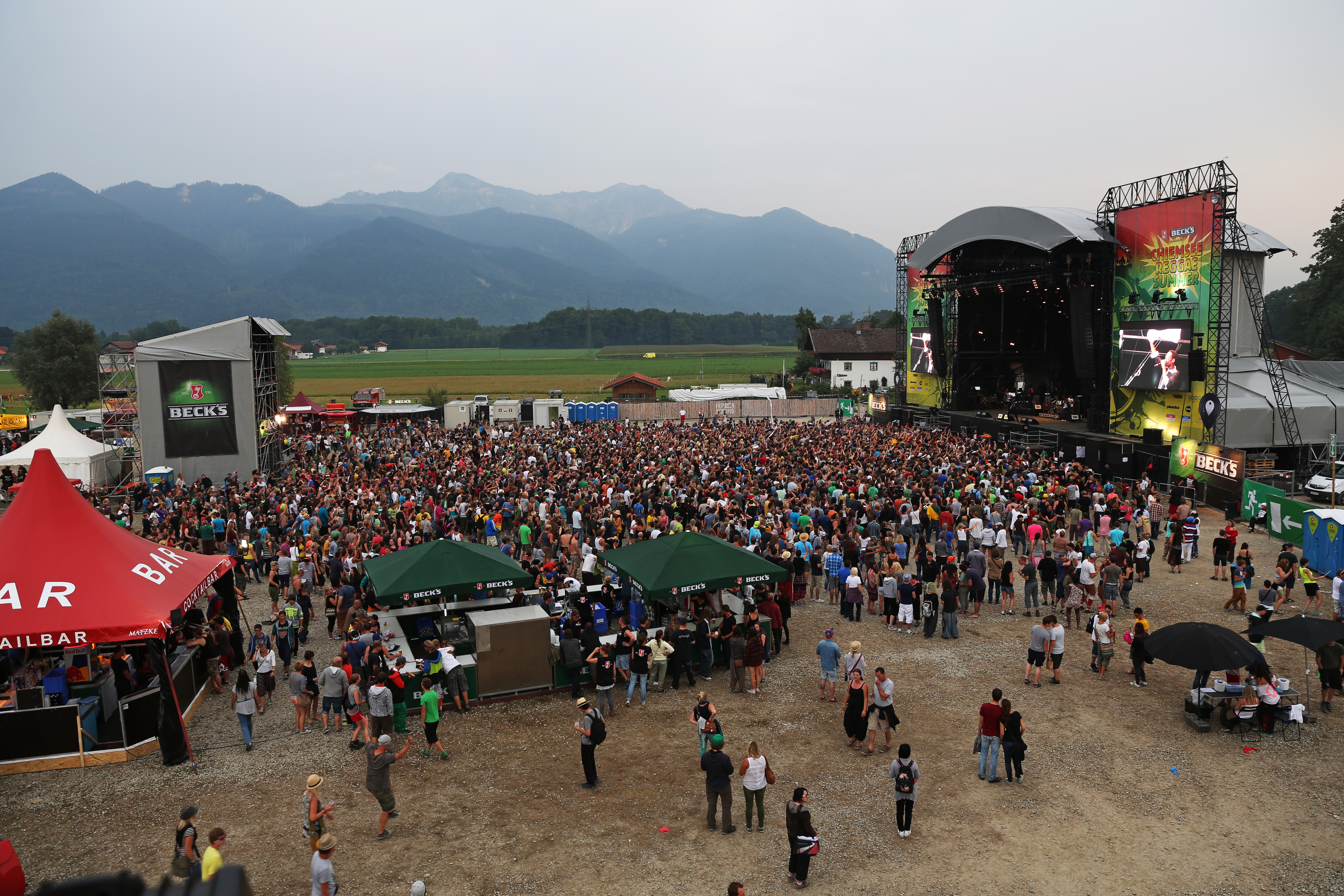
Stage at Chiemsee Reggae Summer '13

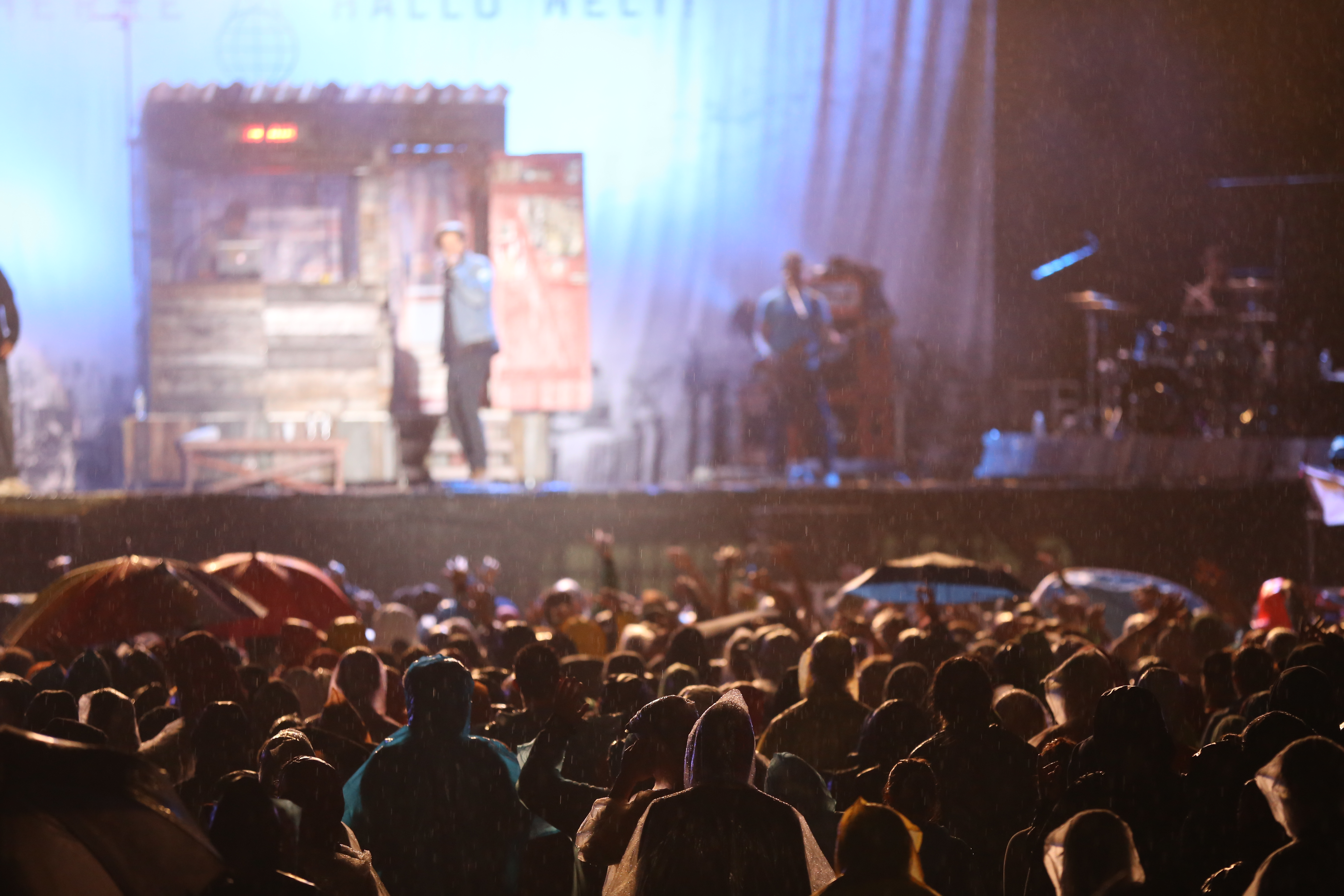
Chiemsee Reggae Summer - Max Herre & Afrob

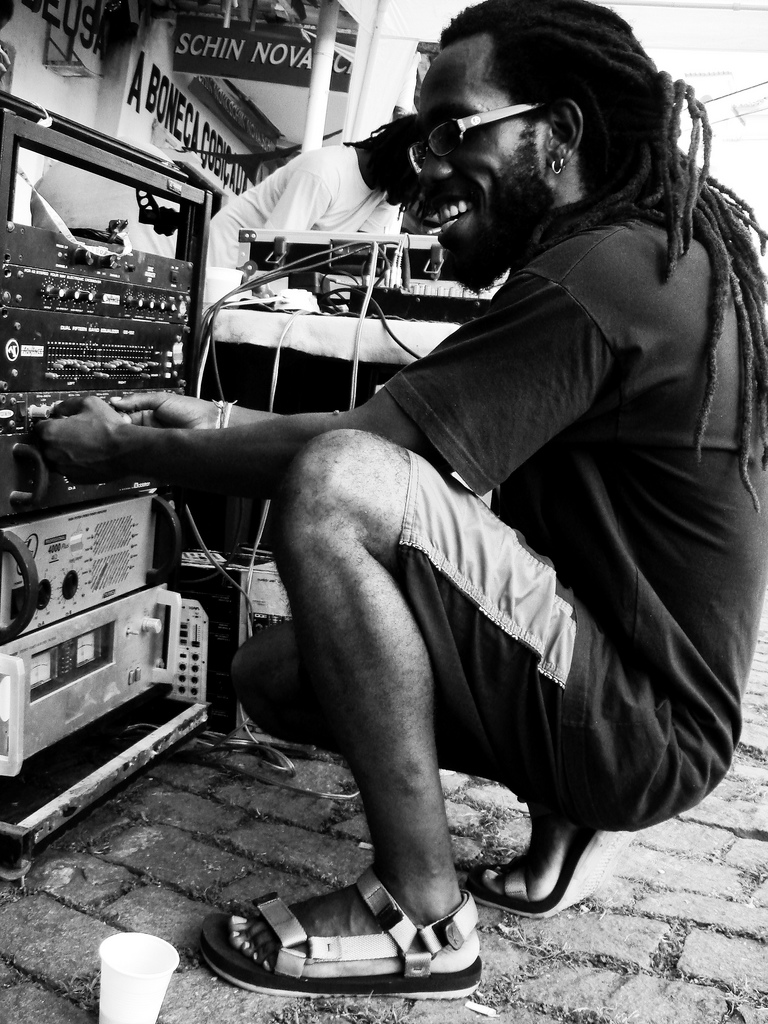
Dub Brazil

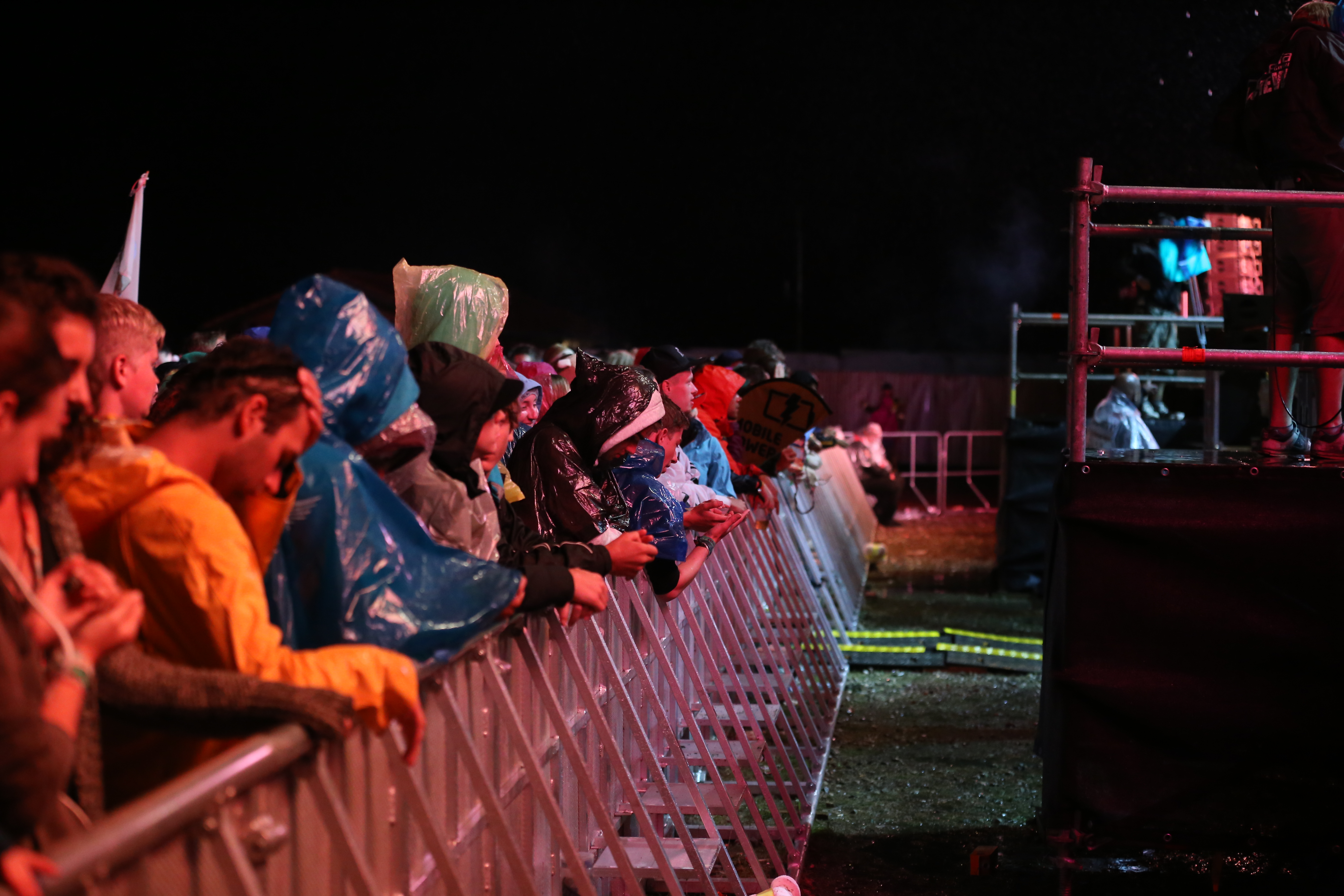
Chiemsee Reggae Summer - Ska-P

== See also ==
=== Related lists ===
- List of electronic music festivals
- List of jam band music festivals
- List of jazz festivals
- List of music festivals

=== Related categories ===
- Category:Jazz festivals
- Category:Music festivals
- Category:Reggae festivals
- Category:World music festivals
