= Dream Concert =

Dream Concert may refer to:

- Dream Concert (South Korea), an annual K-pop joint concert held in South Korea
- The 14 Hour Technicolor Dream, a 1967 fundraising concert held in London, U.K.
- The Dream Concert: Live from the Great Pyramids of Egypt, a 2016 live concert album and video by Yanni
- Wonder Dream Concert, a 1975 concert held in Jamaica
