= Softley =

Softley is a surname. Notable people with the surname include:

- Iain Softley (born 1956), English film director, producer, and screenwriter
- Mick Softley (1939–2017), British singer-songwriter and guitarist
- Mortimer Softley (born 1975), Guyanese reggae singer better known as Natural Black
- Timothy Softley, British academic
