= Drinking the Kool-Aid =

Expression

"Drinking the Kool-Aid" is a neologism for a strong belief in and acceptance of a dogma, a deadly, deranged, or foolish ideology, or concept based only upon the overpowering coaxing of another. The expression is also used to refer to a person who wrongly has faith in a possibly doomed or dangerous idea because of perceived potential high rewards.

The phrase typically carries a negative connotation. It can also be used ironically or humorously to refer to accepting an idea or changing a preference due to popularity, peer pressure, or persuasion. In recent years, it has evolved further to mean extreme dedication to a cause or purpose, so extreme that one would "drink the Kool-Aid" and die for the cause.

The phrase originated from the events in Jonestown, Guyana, on November 18, 1978, in which over 900 members of the Peoples Temple movement died. The movement's leader, Jim Jones, called a mass meeting at the Jonestown pavilion after the murder of U.S. Congressman Leo Ryan and others in nearby Port Kaituma. Jones proposed "revolutionary suicide" by way of ingesting a powdered drink mix made from Flavor Aid, later misidentified as Kool-Aid, that was lethally laced with cyanide and other drugs.

== Background ==
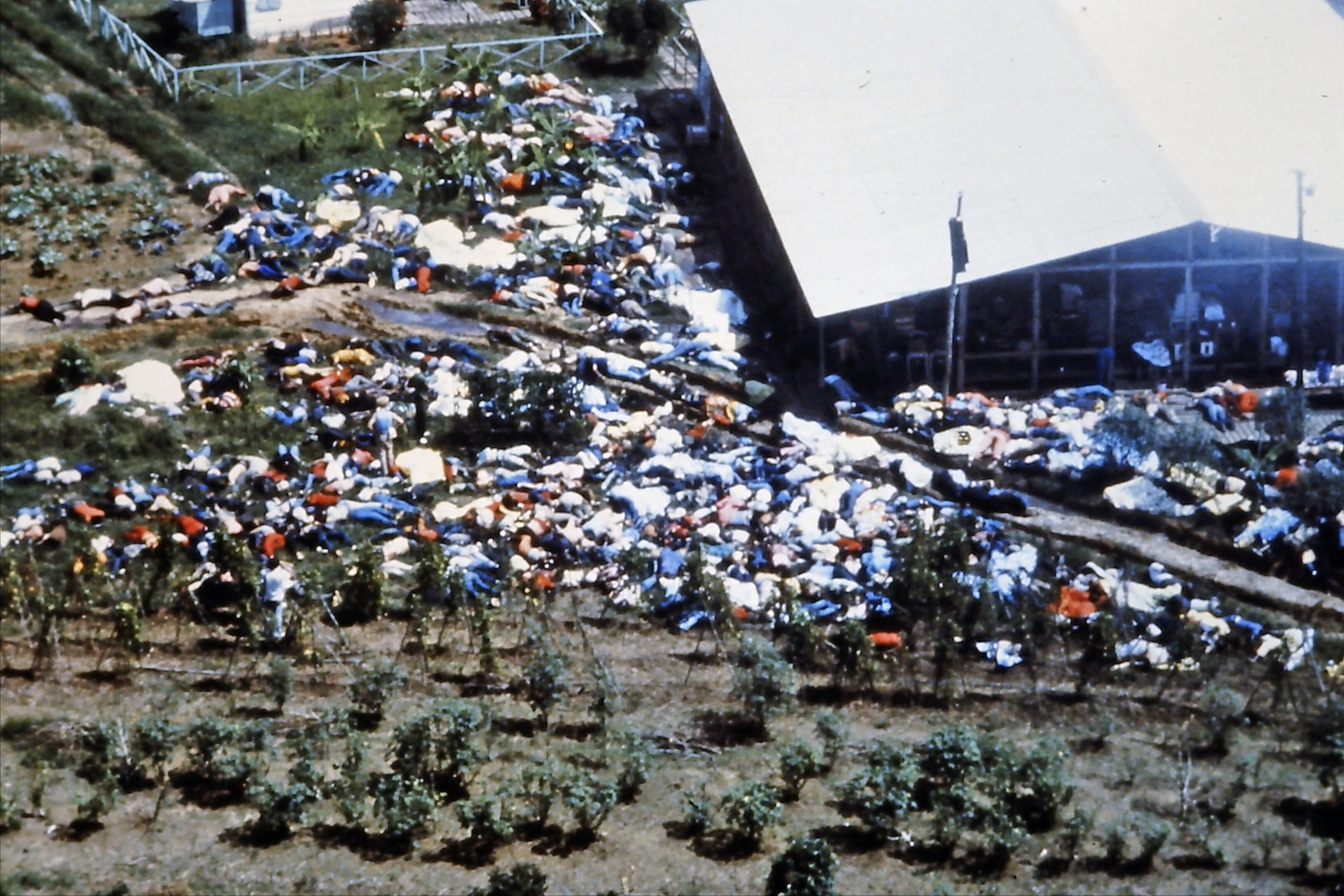
Aerial view of the victims of the 1978 Jonestown Massacre

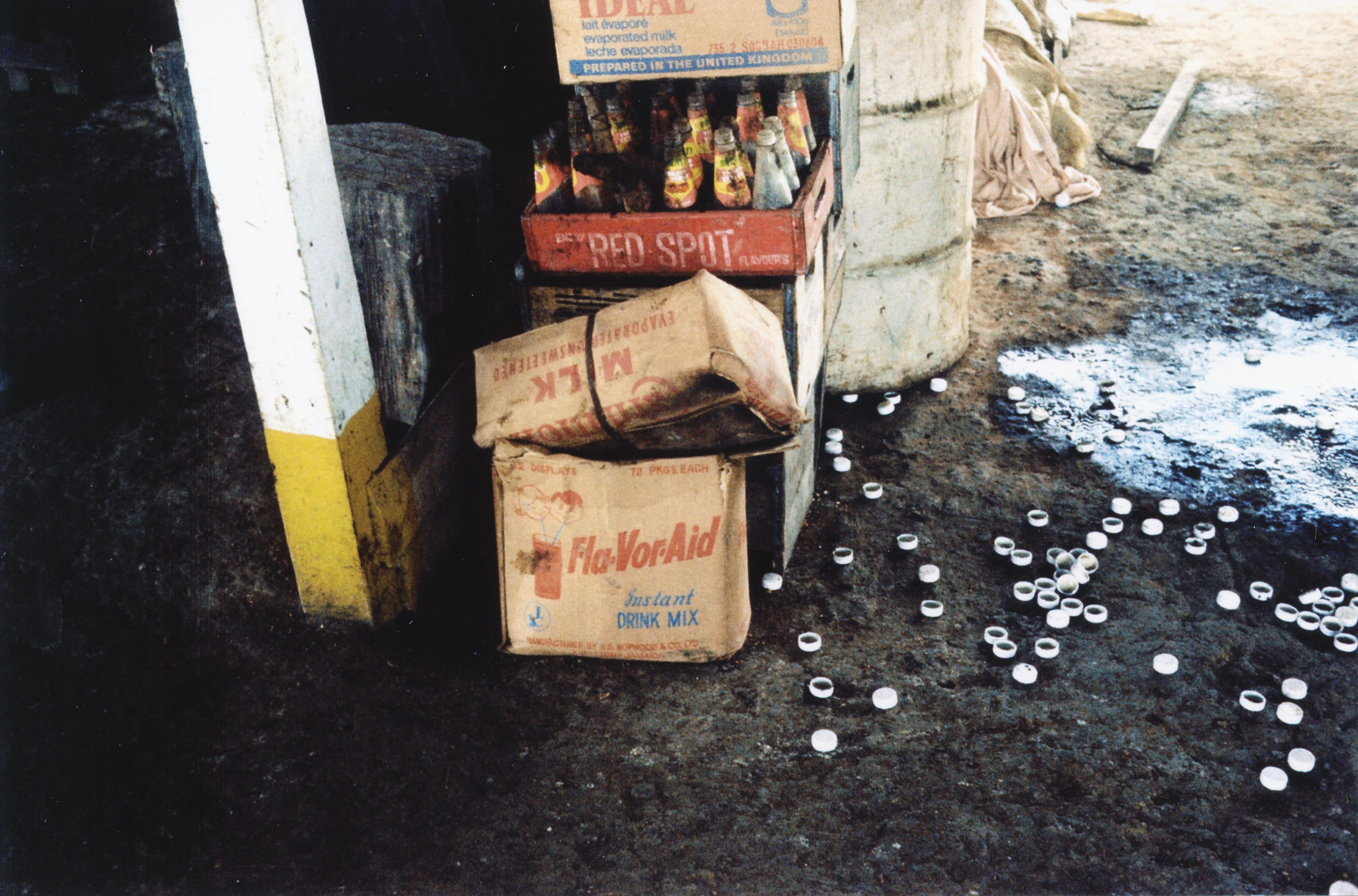
A box of Flavor Aid found amongst other beverages at Jonestown

On November 18, 1978, Jones ordered that the members of Representative Leo Ryan's party be killed after several defectors chose to leave with the party. Residents of the commune later committed suicide by drinking a grape flavored beverage laced with potassium cyanide. Some were forced to drink it; some others, such as small children, drank it unknowingly. About 918 people died.

Descriptions of the event often refer to the beverage not as Kool-Aid but as Flavor Aid, a less-expensive product reportedly found at the site. Kraft Foods, the maker of Kool-Aid, has stated the same. Film footage shot inside the compound prior to the events of November shows Jones opening a large chest in which boxes of Flavor Aid are visible.

Criminal investigators testifying at the Jonestown inquest spoke of finding packets of "cool aid" [sic], and eyewitnesses to the incident are also recorded as speaking of "cool aid" or "Cool Aid." It is unclear whether they intended to refer to the actual Kool-Aid–brand drink or were using the name in a generic sense that might refer to any powdered flavored beverage.

The group had engaged in many "dry runs" using unpoisoned drink.

Seventy or more individuals at Jonestown were injected with poison, and a third (304) of the victims were minors. Guards armed with guns and crossbows had been ordered to shoot those who fled the Jonestown pavilion as Jones lobbied for suicide.

== Use ==
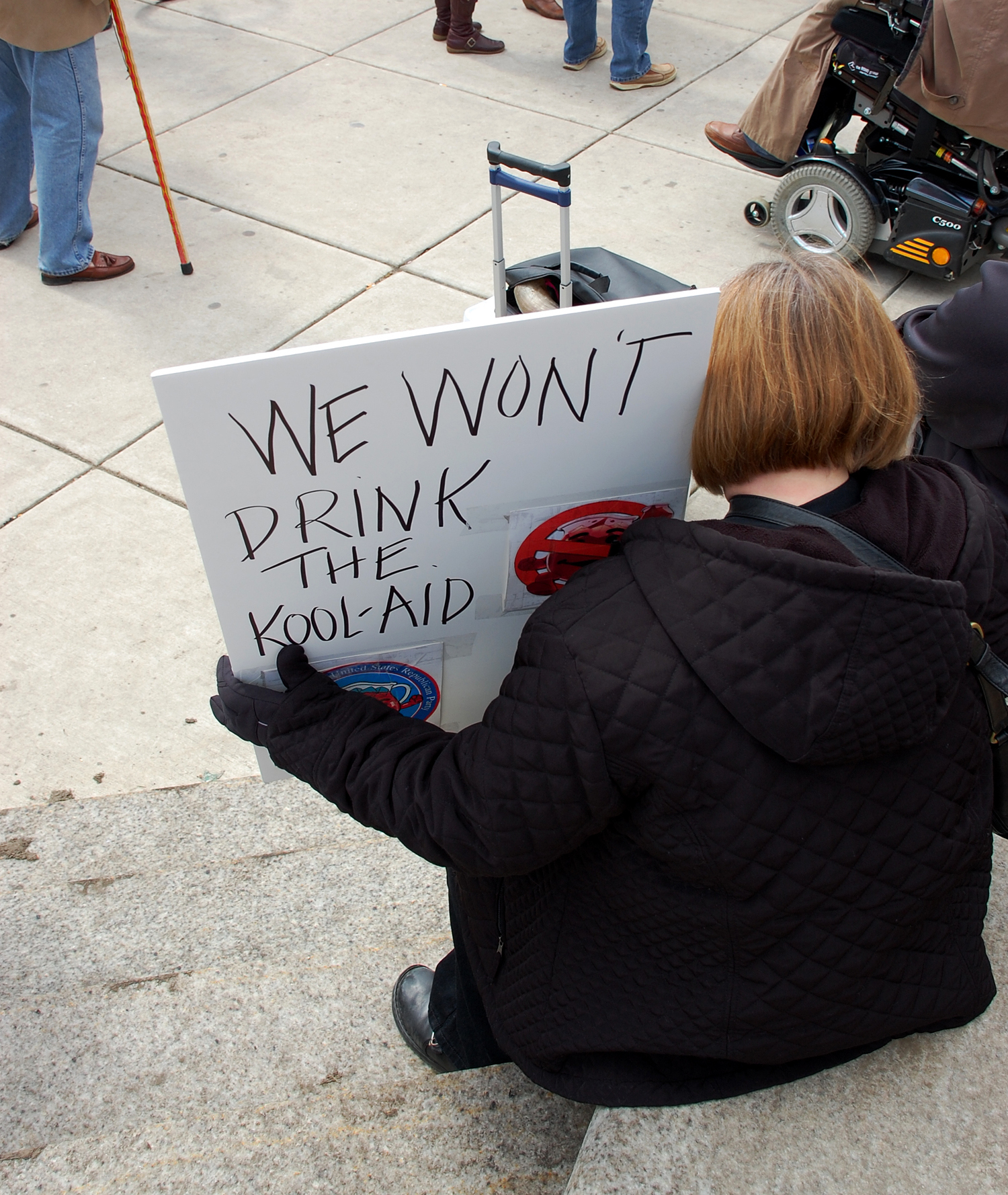
A sign during the 2011 Wisconsin protests, reading "we won't drink the kool-aid"

The first known use of the phrase was in a passage from the 1968 non-fiction book The Electric Kool-Aid Acid Test by Tom Wolfe, where it is used by Clair Brush, who works for the Los Angeles Free Press, to describe an unsuccessful attempt to stop someone with a poor mental health record from drinking Kool-Aid laced with LSD, who then subsequently had a bad psychedelic experience. The Atlantic hypothesized that this story, which caused "many Americans [to become] familiar with the idea of being urged to drink Kool-Aid containing ... unusual chemicals", contributed to the misconception that Kool-Aid was used in Jonestown.

The first known allusion to the phrase after Jonestown occurred only a few days later, on November 26, when The Clarion-Ledger reported that an Ole Miss Rebels football player said to an opposition player, "If I were one of your fans, I'd drink some Kool-Aid." A few days after that, in December 1978, Rev. Dr. William Sloane Coffin told a convention of the American unit of Pax Christi that American planning for nuclear war and preparations for the civil defense was "the Kool-Aid drill without the cyanide."

According to academic Rebecca Moore, early analogies to Jonestown and Kool-Aid were based around death and suicide, not blind obedience. The earliest example she found of the latter use, via a Lexis-Nexis search, was a 1982 statement from Lane Kirkland, then head of the AFL-CIO, which described Ronald Reagan's policies as "Jonestown economics," which "administers Kool-Aid to the poor, the deprived and the unemployed." However, the Oxford English Dictionary identified an earlier example, from February 20, 1981, when The Gettysburg Times reported that Allen Ginsberg told a public meeting, "We are all being put in the place of the citizens of Jonestown, being told by our leaders to drink the Kool Aid of nuclear power."

In 1984, a Reagan administration appointee, Clarence M. Pendleton Jr., chairman of the United States Commission on Civil Rights, was quoted as criticizing civil rights leaders Jesse Jackson, Vernon Jordan Jr., and Benjamin Hooks by making an analogy between allegiance to "the black leadership" and blind obedience to the Jonestown leaders: "We refuse to be led into another political Jonestown as we were led during the Presidential campaign. No more Kool-Aid, Jesse, Vernon, and Ben. We want to be free."

In 1989, Jack Solerwitz, a lawyer for many of the air traffic controllers who lost their jobs in the 1981 PATCO strike, explained his dedication to their cause in spite of the substantial personal financial losses he incurred by saying: "I was the only lawyer who kept the doors open for them, and I thought I'd get a medal for it. ... Instead, I was the one who drank the Kool-Aid."

The widespread use of the phrase with its current meaning may have begun in the late 1990s. In some cases it began to take on a neutral or even positive light, implying simply great enthusiasm. In 1998, the dictionary website logophilia.com defined the phrase thus: "To become a firm believer in something; to accept an argument or philosophy whole-heartedly."

The phrase has been used in the business and technology worlds to mean fervent devotion to a certain company or technology. A 2000 The New York Times article about the end of the dot-com bubble noted, "The saying around San Francisco Web shops these days, as companies run out of money, is 'Just keep drinking the Kool-Aid,' a tasteless reference to the Jonestown massacre," of which many of the victims were from the Bay Area.

The phrase has also often been used in a political context, usually with a negative implication. In 2002, Arianna Huffington used the phrase "pass the Kool-Aid, pardner" in a column about an economic forum hosted by President George W. Bush. Later, commentators Michelangelo Signorile and Bill O'Reilly have used the term to describe those whom they perceive as following certain ideologies blindly. In a 2009 speech, Newsweek editor Jon Meacham stressed his political independence by saying, "I did not drink the Obama Kool-Aid last year."

In 2011, columnist Meghan Daum wrote that the phrase had become "one of the nation's most popular idiomatic trends," while bemoaning its rise in popularity, calling its usage "grotesque, even offensive." She cited, among others, usages by Starbucks CEO Howard Schultz, who said that he "drank the Kool-Aid as much as anyone else about Obama," and Us Weekly magazine, which reported during the short marriage of Kim Kardashian and Kris Humphries that "Kris is not drinking the Kardashian Kool-Aid."

In February 2012, "Drinking the Kool-Aid" won first place in an online poll by Forbes magazine as "the single most annoying example of business jargon."

"Controversy", a track from Natalia Kills's 2013 album Trouble, includes the lyric "Drink the Kool-Aid, don't drink the Kool-Aid". Kills explained that the song critiques the hypocrisy of societal judgment and the way suffering is often sensationalized, particularly in the media and on social media.

In the 2020 book Rage by Bob Woodward, which is an outcome of 18 interviews with then-former president Donald Trump, Woodward quotes Trump's reaction to his question about the responsibility of white, wealthy people who should help understand general population motivations of Black Lives Matter protesters. Trump replied: "You really drank the Kool-Aid, didn't you? Just listen to you."

In 2024, English metal band Bring Me the Horizon released a song titled "Kool-Aid". Its chorus refers to drinking "the Kool-Aid by the jug", and is one of several songs by the band to use cult imagery and allusions as part of their ongoing Post Human project.

In 2025, Ottawa-based playwright Josh Klein wrote the absurdist comedic play Drink the Kool-Aid for the city's Youth Infringement Festival. The play follows the Public Relations team of the Kool-Aid company, and its attempts to manage their brand image following the Jonestown tragedy. It was directed by Breanna Doyle and premiered at the 2026 Youth Infringement Festival. The play was later revived for the city's Off//Shoots Festival following positive reception.

== See also ==
- Irrationality – Thinking, talking, or acting without inclusion of rationality
- Skepticism – Doubtful attitude toward knowledge claims
