= Positive Vibration =

Positive Vibration may refer to:

- Positive Vibration (festival), reggae festival in Liverpool, England
- Positive Vibration (album), 2001 release by Gramps Morgan
- "Positive Vibration" (song), written by Vincent Ford, on the 1976 album Rastaman Vibration by Bob Marley and the Wailers

== See also ==
- Positive Vibrations, 1974 blues album by Ten Years After
