= Judith Cohen =

Judith Cohen may refer to:

- Judy Chicago (born 1939), born Judith Cohen, American feminist artist, art educator, and writer
- Judith Gamora Cohen (born 1946), astronomer and professor
- Judith Love Cohen (1933–2016), American aerospace engineer and author
- Judith R. Cohen (born 1949), Canadian ethnomusicologist
- Judith Solomon Cohen (1766–1837), matriarch of one of the earliest Jewish families in Baltimore, Maryland
- Judith Cohen, birth name of Judith Montefiore (1784–1862), British linguist, musician, travel writer, and philanthropist
