= Öland Roots =

- Genre: Reggae,
- Dates: June or July
- Locations: Öland, Sweden
- Years active: 2004-present
- Attendance: 2000+
- Website: Öland Roots official website (English)

Öland Roots is an annual reggae music festival on Öland, Sweden. It has been held since 2004 in June or July with about 2 000 visitors. The festival is known to be comparatively calm with little violence and few arrests.

== See also ==
- List of reggae festivals
- Reggae
