= Clubsound =

Northern Irish showband and cabaret act

Clubsound are a showband from Northern Ireland. Formed in 1970, the band enjoyed particular success during the 1970s and 1980s. The original line-up featured George Jones, drummer Bryan "Tommy" Thomas from Wales who wrote much of the comedy material (died c. 22 April 2022)), Dave McKnight, Barry Woods and Alan McCartney.

They started in 1955 as a seven-piece skiffle band called Danie Sands and the Javelins. The band later did backing singing before evolving into a comedy cabaret act, with Van Morrison often present. Clubsound enjoyed several locally successful singles, including Belfast, Belfast, The Professionals and Shankill Airways.

== Members ==
The original lineup featured Jones, Thomas, Woods, McCartney and McKnight. The later lineup featured Jones, Woods, McCartney, McKnight, Jimmy Black and Harry Hickland. Jones stated in 1997: "The main nucleus of Clubsound was myself, Tommy Thomas, Billy Bingham, Harry Hickland and Eddie McCrudden".

Early practice sessions would take place outside Jones' house. Van Morrison, then a part-time saxophone player, would often join these sessions. Indeed, a band called The Monarchs was formed prior to Clubsound that included Morrison. After the Monarchs disbanded, and Morrison went on to lead the band Them, the other members of the Monarchs formed Clubsound.

The band got its name from a suggestion made by Dermot O'Donnell, manager of the Abercorn Bar in Belfast. The Abercorn Cabaret Club was to become the band's residency for three years.

Though no longer a permanent band, Clubsound have had intermittent reunion tours, sometimes writing new material.

After Thomas' death, Jones paid his friend a warm tribute: "Yesterday we said goodbye to our dear friend Tommy Thomas and although he may be gone his legacy will never be forgotten, especially in little gems like [Belfast, Belfast] that he wrote for Clubsound ... I know there will be a few snowflakes who weren't born when this was released and probably frown, but let me assure you that songs like this and many others written by Tom, brought many moments of laughter to many people during the darkest hours of the troubles across Northern Ireland".
