= Ottawa Reggae Festival =

The Ottawa Reggae Festival was a volunteer driven music festival held annually from 2008 to 2010 at Le Breton Flats Park, Ottawa. The festival was cancelled in 2010, its third year due to the financial troubles of the festival's president, Benjamin Williams.

== History ==
Reggae music originated in Jamaica in the 1960s and has grown to become a worldwide cultural and musical expression. The inaugural Ottawa Reggae Festival was held in 2008 as a one-day event. An added day became the Heineken Dance Party designed to showcase local and regional artists along with Disc Jockeys all from the reggae industry. The 2008 line-up included Canada's Dancehall and Reggae artist Jamilean, UK artist Maxi Priest, Canada's Reggaeton musician El Neggro, Bermudian Collie Buddz, and Toronto's Snow.

Since the inaugural year, the festival has received support from the community and the Ontario Arts Council, the City of Ottawa and Heritage Canada. It became a member of Ottawa Festivals, but it is no longer a member in 2019.

The Ottawa Reggae Festival also hosts community events around the nation's capital throughout the year. These events include the 46th Anniversary Celebration of Jamaican Independence with the Ottawa Rapidz, a Canada Day Block Party downtown and Marley Night event celebrating Black History Month. As of 2019, the event has grown to a 3-day long international festival.

Coca-Cola partnered with the festival's green team, making it possible to recycle over 240 cubic feet (6,800 L) of cardboard, plastic and aluminum.

== Controversy ==
In its third year, The Ottawa Reggae Festival has come under fire for financial mismanagement, artist no-shows, and cancelled performances. On August 21, 2010, monies and receipts were seized from the festival's beer tent following a court ruling against the festival from A. Raoul Nembhard, the festival's former chief financial officer. Nemhard claimed that he had not been reimbursed for his out-of-pocket expenses incurred during the previous year's festival.

On August 22, 2010, the last day of the festival, the entire day of performances was cancelled with its headlining acts, Sean Paul and Ky-mani Marley, pulling out. Many of the vendors and performers feared that they would not be paid. Sean Paul's representative, Headline Entertainment, cited a lack of confidence in the festival's ability to pay Paul's $50,000 appearance fee after delays in obtaining a deposit from the festival. Sean Paul took to Twitter to blame the promoters for disorganization and to apologize to his Canadian fans.

L3 magazine, sponsor and publicist of the festival, issued a release blaming the President Benjamin Williams for the festival's financial troubles. The festival's board of directors also released a statement criticising the 25-year-old Williams for his "youth and inexperience" and poor financial decisions.

== See also ==
- List of reggae festivals
- Reggae
