= Timeless Festival =

- Origin: Huddersfield, England
- Genres: Electronica, hip hop, rock, dance, soul
- Years active: 2002–2005
- Members: Timeless Music Project
- Website: http://www.timelessfestival.com/

Timeless Festival was a community music festival in Huddersfield, Kirklees, which ran from 2002 to 2005, "Pick of the Week" in The Guardian for the latter two. It was organised by Chocolate Fireguard Records and the Timeless Music Project, and featured three stages in Ravensknowle Park, Wakefield Road, Huddersfield.

Acts included DJ Vadim, Lo Fidelity Allstars, Fat City Records Sound System, Oneself, Zion Train, Kava Kava, Root Jackson, The Freestylers, Fingathing, Transglobal Underground, The Bays, Panjabi Hit Squad, La Cedille, Snowboy and the Latin Section, Iration Steppas, Jehst, Asaviour, DJ IQ, Four Day Hombre, The Voltaires, The Selecter, Pee Wee Ellis, Dub Dadda and others.
