= Real Beat Festival =

Coordinates: 50°4′53.09″N 14°25′31.06″E

Real Beat (Reggae Ethnic Session)
- Genre: Reggae, dancehall
- Locations: Czech Republic, Prague
- Years active: 2000 to 2010
- Website: Official festival site

Real Beat festival was a reggae/dancehall festival in the Czech Republic. The festival was held from 2000 to 2006 under the name Reggae Ethnic Session. The first edition with the current name took place in 2007 under the Točník castle. The main headliner was the famous Jamaican singer Anthony B. The 11th edition of the festival was held in 2010 in Česká Lípa.

In 2011 the festival did not take place, being described at the time as a temporary break, but by 2012 it was already described as having disappeared.

== See also ==
- List of reggae festivals
- Reggae
