= Elmgrove Primary School =

Coordinates: 54.5913°N 5.8914°W

Location
- Avoniel Road; Belfast, County Down, BT5 4SF; Northern Ireland

Information
- School type: Primary
- Motto: Have the courage to do what you know is right
- Established: 9 January 1933; 93 years ago
- Status: Open
- Local authority: Education Authority
- Principal: Mrs Jayne Jeffers BEd(Hons) PQH(NI)
- Years offered: 8
- Gender: Co-Educational
- Age: 3 to 11
- Houses: Bingham; Jones; Morrison; Ervine
- Colour
- Website: elmgroveprimary.co.uk

Elmgrove Primary School (Sometimes referred to as simply Elmgrove and originally known as Elmgrove Elementary School) is a state-controlled Primary School situated in East Belfast, Northern Ireland. It opened on 9 January 1933 as Elmgrove Elementary School.

The original Elmgrove building at Beersbridge Road closed in November 2024. A new building at the former Avoniel Primary School site became home to Elmgrove from December 2024.

== History ==
Elmgrove opened in 1932/1933 as Elmgrove Elementary School. Pupils from nearby schools were all moved into Elmgrove. Several famous/well-known people from Belfast attended the school. In 2008 Peter Robinson visited the school and several P7 pupils got to ask him questions about his childhood and career. In 2009 Henry Winkler (The Fonz) visited the school to talk about reading books and his new book. During elections, the school is used as a polling station.

In 2008 Elmgrove celebrated its 75th anniversary. Special medals made from Mambco, were given to all the pupils. Special balloons were also present and two students from each year group got a balloon and released it into the air with a note attached saying that, when found, contact the school, to see how far the balloon travelled. The farthest known distance was to Scotland.

Nearby Avoniel Primary School closed in 2015 and merged with Elmgrove, with the old school building still used to teach students in.

The school introduced a house system named after four past pupils of the school, Bingham, Morrison, Jones and Ervine.

The original Elmgrove at Beersbridge closed in November 2024, after a final tour for past pupils and staff to see the building one last time. A new school was built on the former Avoniel Primary School site, with Elmgrove at Avoniel opening in December 2024.

== Principals ==
- John Sullivan 1932–1948
- Arthur Clemitson 1948–1972
- Dr Jim Hunter 1972-1995/1996
- Frazer Thompson 1995/1996-2000
- David Hutchinson 2000–2011 (his death, 11 August 2011)
- Andrea Brown 2011–2013 (Acting)
- Jayne Jeffers April 2013–present
  - Pauline Russell April 2024-November 2024 (Acting)

== Former pupils ==
- Billy Bingham, footballer
- Van Morrison, musician
- George Cassidy, jazz musician
- Sammy Wilson, politician
- David Ervine, politician
- Ian Paisley Jr, politician
- George Jones, musician and presenter

== Projects ==
=== Out of this World ===
In 2006, pupils from Elmgrove took part in a new CCEA teaching resource called Out of this World. They were joined with St. Teresa's Primary School for the activity. Pupils made different objects with recycled materials.

=== Connswater Community Greenway Project ===
Elmgrove has been involved with the local project to refurbish the local walkway and river next to the school. Over the years, the Conn O'Neill bridge and river nearby has been vandalised. The school has represented the project several times, first on 14 November 2007 and the second on 24 October 2008. One of the bridges along the Greenway was named after former principal David Hutchinson.

=== Over the Halfpenny Bridge ===
In 2009, Elmgrove stated that a new production was in the works with Dance United NI. The show was later named Over the Halfpenny Bridge. It was about the History of Belfast and starred the P7 pupils of that year, and Elderly members from nearby nursing homes, Elmgrove Manor and Greenville Court. 'I am staggered by the range and the quality of what has been produced this evening,' said school principal David Hutchinson. 'The children have acquired so many new skills by working with this terrific company and, through them, all of our minds have been opened.' The children worked with Writer Ruth Carr, Rastafarian poet Levi Tafari, printmaker Robin Cordiner, musicians Nikki Such, Patrick and Bronagh Davey and Irish, Greek and Indian dancers. On 2 April 2009, the show was performed live in St George's Market, Belfast.

=== Eco-Schools programme ===
Since 2009, the school has taken part in an Eco programme to make the school more eco-friendly. The School has Recently won the Green Flag Award

=== Sesame Tree ===
In 2010, P2 pupils from the school starred in a T.V series that aired on CBeebies called Sesame Tree, Northern Ireland's version of Sesame Street.
