= Alborosie =

Italian-Jamaican reggae artist (born 1977)

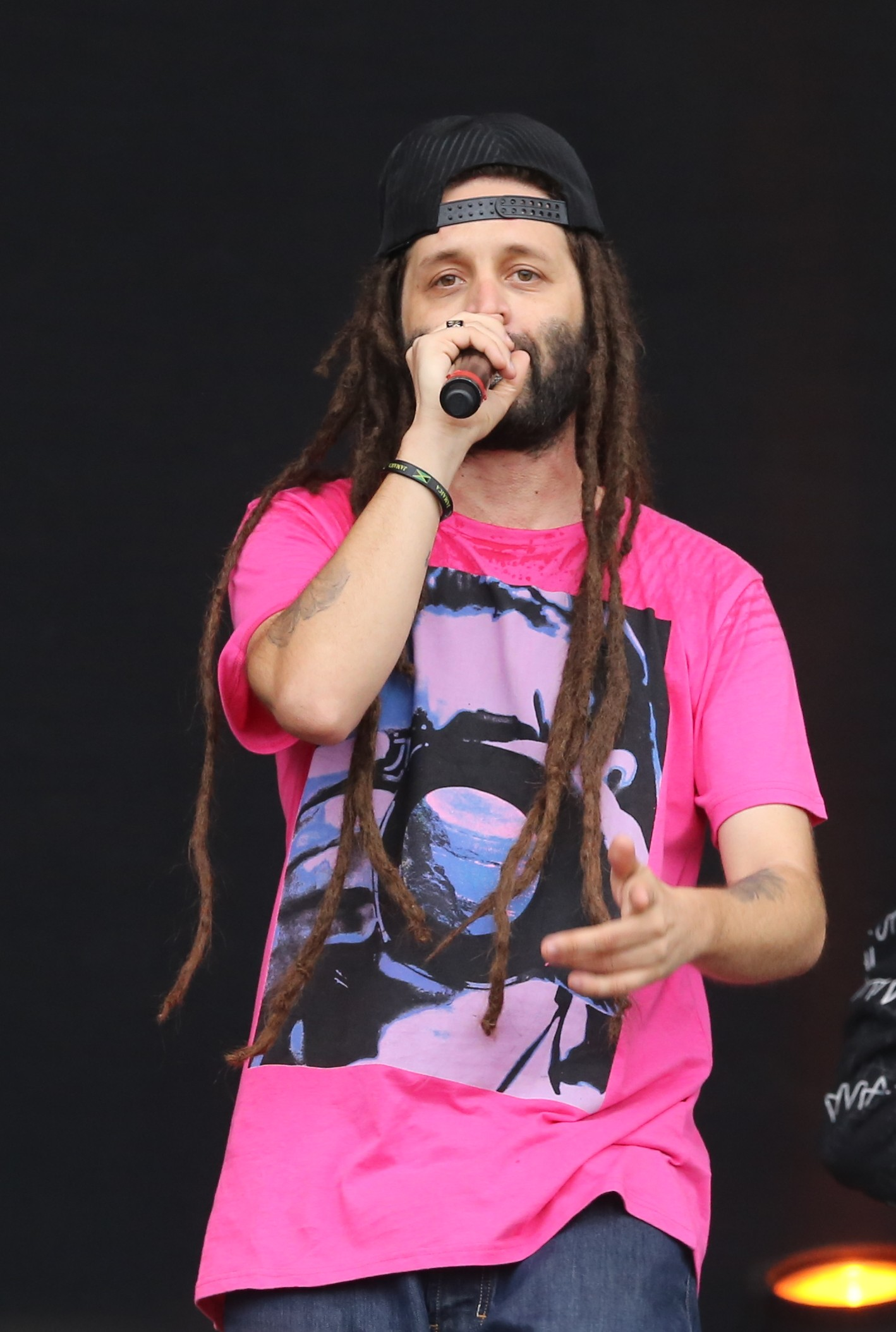
- Alborosie performing at Chiemsee Reggae Summer 2013

Background information
- Born: Alberto D'Ascola; 4 July 1977 (age 49); Marsala, Sicily, Italy
- Genres: Reggae, dancehall, dub
- Occupations: Singer-songwriter, record producer
- Instruments: Vocals, drums, guitar, keyboard, bass
- Years active: 1993–present
- Labels: Greensleeves, VP
- Website: www.alborosiemusic.com

Alberto D'Ascola (Italian pronunciation: [alˈbɛrto ˈdaskola]; born 4 July 1977), better known by his stage name Alborosie, is an Italian reggae artist. He is sometimes called the "Italian Reggae Ambassador".

== Music career ==
=== Early life (2001–2005) ===
Born Alberto d’Ascola and raised in Marsala, Sicily, Italy, but now residing in Kingston, Jamaica, he is a multi-instrumentalist, being proficient in guitar, bass, drums and keyboard. His musical career began in the Italian reggae band Reggae National Tickets, from Bergamo city, when he was 15 years old in 1993, in which he was known as Stena.

In 2001, Alborosie decided to try a solo career. He moved to Jamaica to be close to reggae music's roots and Rastafari culture. There, he started working as a sound engineer and producer. He has also worked with artists like Gentleman and Ky-Mani Marley. His first solo album was called Soul Pirate. In the summer of 2009, he released his second album which was called Escape from Babylon. In August 2008, Alborosie played at the Uppsala Reggae Festival.

The name "Alborosie" comes from a name he was given in the early years after moving to Jamaica. "Borosie was what they used to call me. Let me put it like this. My early experience in Jamaica was... not nice. Borosie was a name they used to call me and it has a negative meaning. So I said, "I'm gonna use this name and mash up the place, turn a negative into a positive thing!". Basically my name is Albert so I add 'Al', Al-borosie. But I'm not gonna tell you what borosie mean!"

=== Soul Pirate & Escape From Babylon (2006–2009) ===
In 2006, Alborosie released his debut album, Soul Pirate, which included hit singles: "Rastafari Anthem", "Kingston Town", and "Call Up Jah" on his own record label, Forward Recordings.

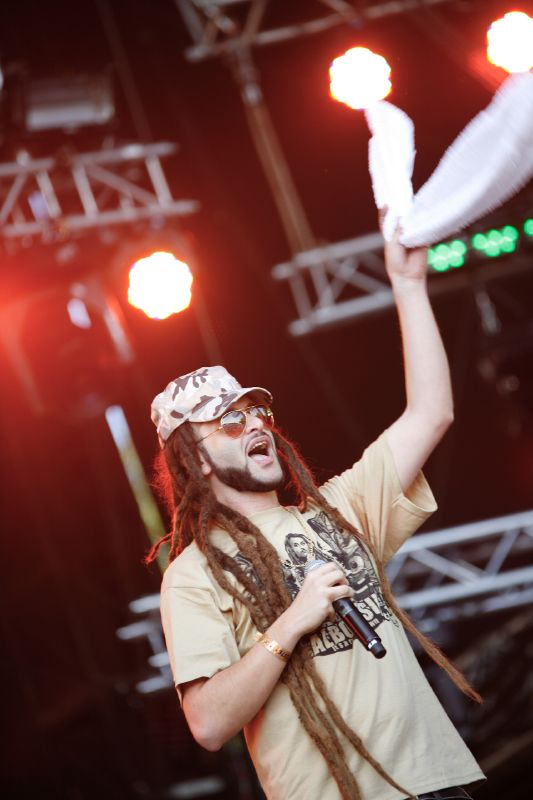
Alborosie performing live in concert in 2008

He released his second album, Escape From Babylon in 2009 on Greensleeves Records. Through the years he has given concerts all round the world, including most of Europe and Jamaica. He also released a compilation, Escape from Babylon to the Kingdom of Zion on Greensleeves Records in 2010.

=== Dub Clash, 2 Times Revolution, & Sound The System (2010–2013) ===
After releasing his first Dub music album, Dub Clash in 2010 and his third album, 2 Times Revolution, Alborosie became the first white artist to win the M.O.B.O. (Music of Black Origin) Awards in the Best Reggae Act category for 2011.

Alborosie released his fourth album, Sound The System on Greensleeves Records in 2013. He followed it up with a dub music version with, Dub the System in 2013 on Greensleeves Records.

He released Sound the System Showcase in 2014, a compilation album.

=== Collaborations & Re-masters (2014–2015) ===
Alborosie released a dub album he collaborated with King Jammy called, Dub of Thrones – With King Jammy in 2013 on VP Records.

In 2014, Greensleeves Records released, Specialist Presents Alborosie & Friends, a collection of collaborations with other reggae artists. The album entered the Billboard Top Reggae Albums chart at #7.

Alborosie collaborated with King Jammy on another dub album, Reality of Dub, which was released in early 2015.

In 2015, his classic debut album Soul Pirate, which was released by Evolution Music Group, was re-mastered and released in Deluxe Remastered Edition with 4 never-before-released bonus tracks: "Call Up Jah", "Slambam", "Streets", and "Jamaica".

=== Freedom & Fyah & The Rockers (2016) ===
In May 2016, Alborosie's fifth album Freedom & Fyah was released on VP records. In the end of 2016, Evolution Music Group released his classic album Soul Pirate in an acoustic version. The album was released on CD and CD+DVD formats. He also released his sixth studio album, The Rockers on August 24, 2016.

He also released another dub album, Freedom in Dub on VP Records in 2017.

=== Collaborations with The Wailers and Roots Radics (2016–2019) ===
His 2018 seventh studio album, Unbreakable: Alborosie Meets The Wailers United peaked at #6 on the Billboard Reggae Albums chart.

Alborosie collaborated with Roots Radics on the 2019 album Alborosie Meets the Roots Radics: Dub for the Radicals.

=== For The Culture (2021) ===
On June 4, 2021, Alborosie released his eighth studio album, titled In The Culture. It features fourteen tracks that were written, produced, and performed in the during the COVID-19 pandemic using vintage analogue gear, dub sirens, reel-to-reel tape, and live instrumentation by Alborosie and the Roots Radics band. Special guest performers Alborosie collaborated with were Collie Buddz, Jo Mersa Marley, Quino of Big Mountain, and The Wailing Souls, the latest album of which–Back-A-Yard–was produced by Alborosie.

In December 2021, Alborosie was nominated for the fans-choice "2021 Album of the Year" award by Surf Roots TV & Radio for their album For The Culture. Voting was determined by Facebook, Instagram and Twitter users. This was the band's first time being nominated with the reggae rock streaming TV channel on Amazon Fire TV, Apple TV, and Roku.

== Personal life ==
Alberto D'Ascola was born on 4 July 1977 in Marsala, Sicily, Italy.

His father is a retired policeman and his mother was a housewife. D'Ascola developed an interest in reggae music and joined the band Reggae National Tickets in 1992 (at the age of 15.) He is a dual citizen of both Italy and Jamaica.

== Discography ==
=== Solo studio albums ===
Chart history
Year	Album	Label	Billboard peak
2008	Soul Pirate	Self-produced	—
2009	Escape From Babylon	Greensleeves Records	—
2011	2 Times Revolution	Greensleeves Records	—
2013	Sound The System	VP Records	—
2016	Freedom & Fyah	VP Records	#2
2016	The Rockers	The Saifam Group/Get Up Music	—
2018	Unbreakable: Alborosie Meets the Wailers United	VP Records	#6
2021	For The Culture	VP Records	TBD
2023	Destiny	VP Records	TBD

=== Dub albums ===
Chart history
Year	Album	Label	Billboard peak
2010	Dub Clash	J.D.F.	—
2013	Dub The System	Greensleeves Records	—
2015	Alborosie Meets King Jammy: Dub of Thrones	Greensleeves Records	—
2017	Freedom In Dub	VP Records	—
2019	Alborosie Meets the Roots Radics: Dub For The Radicals	VP Records	—
2021	Back-A-Yard Dub	VP Records	—
2024	Dub Pirate	Evolution Media	–

=== Re-edition albums ===
Chart history
Year	Album	Label	Billboard peak
2010	Escape From Babylon to the Kingdom of Zion	Greensleeves Records	—
2010	Specialists & Friends	Greensleeves Records	—
2014	Specialist Presents Alborosie & Friends	VP Records	#7
2014	Sound The System Showcase	VP Records	—
2015	Soul Pirate: Deluxe Remastered Edition	Evolution Music Group	—
2017	Soul Pirate: Acoustic	Evolution Music Group	—

=== With Reggae National Tickets ===
- Squali (1996)
- Un affare difficile (1997)
- Lascia un po' di te (1998)
- La Isla (1999)
- Roof Club (2000)

=== Produced by Alborosie ===
- Alborosie presents His Majesty Riddim (2016), VP

== Awards and nominations ==
Year	Organisation	Award	Result
2011	2011 MOBO Awards	Best reggae act	Won
