= Reggae on the River =

Annual reggae music festival

Coordinates: 39°59′50.55″N 123°47′27.08″W

- Genre: Reggae, roots reggae, reggae fusion
- Dates: June 25 - 27, 2027
- Locations: Humboldt County, California
- Years active: 1983–2019, 2024-Present
- Website: Official site

Reggae on the River is an annual music festival held along the South Fork Eel River in Humboldt County, California, dedicated to community, nature and reggae music and culture. Originally established in 1984 as a benefit fundraiser for the Mateel Community Center, the festival grew into one of the premier reggae events in North America. After periods of relocation and a multi-year hiatus, the festival was revived at County Line Ranch in Piercy, California, continuing its tradition under the production of the Mateel Community Center.

== History ==
Reggae on the River began in 1984 as a benefit for the Mateel Community Center, a nonprofit for southern Humboldt County, after an arsonist burnt down the community hall in Garberville. The board members at the time were Nancy Shelby and Carol Bruno who worked with Jack Arthur in organizing the festival to raise money for a new hall. It was held at French's Camp (a property located on a bend in the South Fork Eel River owned by the Arthur family near Piercy, California) every year until 2006 when financial issues forced the festival to be relocated for the next two years.

In 2003, the annual festival celebrated its 20th year. A DVD featuring performances from the anniversary was released. It includes performances by Culture, Toots & the Maytals, Third World, Beres Hammond, Israel Vibration, Anthony B., and the Marley brothers.

== 2006 conflict ==
The 2006 concert brought in far less money than previous years. Due to the move to a new site and the expenses incurred in removing equipment from the old location, the Mateel saw no revenue from the 2006 event. In 2007, the festival was canceled in the wake of a legal battle between the Mateel Community Center, People Productions (the company started by Carol Bruno after leaving her position at the Mateel), and Tom Dimmick, the owner of the property which hosted the festival in 2006. The dispute centered on revenues, with the Mateel questioning why profits estimated by People Productions did not materialize, why there was a discrepancy between the number of tickets approved and reported attendance and $300,000 in cash expenditures with no receipts. In the wake of the cancellation of Reggae on the River, People Productions in conjunction with Tom Dimmick produced their own reggae concert at Dimmick Ranch, which was called "Reggae Rising" and took place at Dimmick Ranch on the usual first weekend in August.

== New site ==
From 2008 the festival had occurred at Benbow Lake State Recreation Area, in Benbow, California, north of the event's original location on the South Fork Eel River. In 2013, Reggae on the River returned to its original location at French Camp (just north of Piercy, California) and its original time, the first weekend of August (sometimes the event falls on the last weekend of July, or on the transition from the end of July to the beginning of August, depending on how weekends fall on the calendar year).

In 2019, the festival was cancelled due to low attendance and financial troubles. In 2022, after the COVID-19 pandemic lockdown period was lifted, the Reggae on the River festival did not return due to venue permitting issues. However, two smaller festivals were supported: the new Harvest Hangout, and the 45th Summer Arts and Music Festival.

In 2024, it was announced on Lost Coast Outpost, as well as the Mateel Community Center that the festival would be returning to the County Line Ranch, formerly Dimmick Ranch, location on the first weekend of August 2024, with a co-producer, Hot Milk Entertainment. The festival returned again in 2025 with Hot Milk Entertainment and the Mateel Community Center again co-producing the event.

After 2025, the Mateel parted ways with Hot Milk Entertainment to produce the festival independently. The 2026 was a success and celebrated in the community. The Mateel has announced that Reggae on the River will return to County Line Ranch on a new date, June 25 - 27, 2027.

== See also ==
- List of reggae festivals
- Reggae
