= Midwest Reggae Festival =

Coordinates: 40°51′30″N 81°35′38″W

- Genre: Reggae
- Dates: August
- Locations: Clay's Park Resort in North Lawrence, Ohio
- Years active: 1991–2019, 2021–present
- Website: Main page for the Mid West Reggae Fest

The Midwest Reggae Fest is a three-day reggae event held at Clay's Park Resort in North Lawrence, Ohio. It is an annual event and today the event has completed 35 years. The festival features three days of live reggae bands along with numerous food vendors, vendors of Caribbean fashions and accessories, camping, free canoeing, swimming, water rides, and various other outdoor activities and entertainment.

There was no festival in 2020.

== See also ==
- List of reggae festivals
