= Iration Steppas =

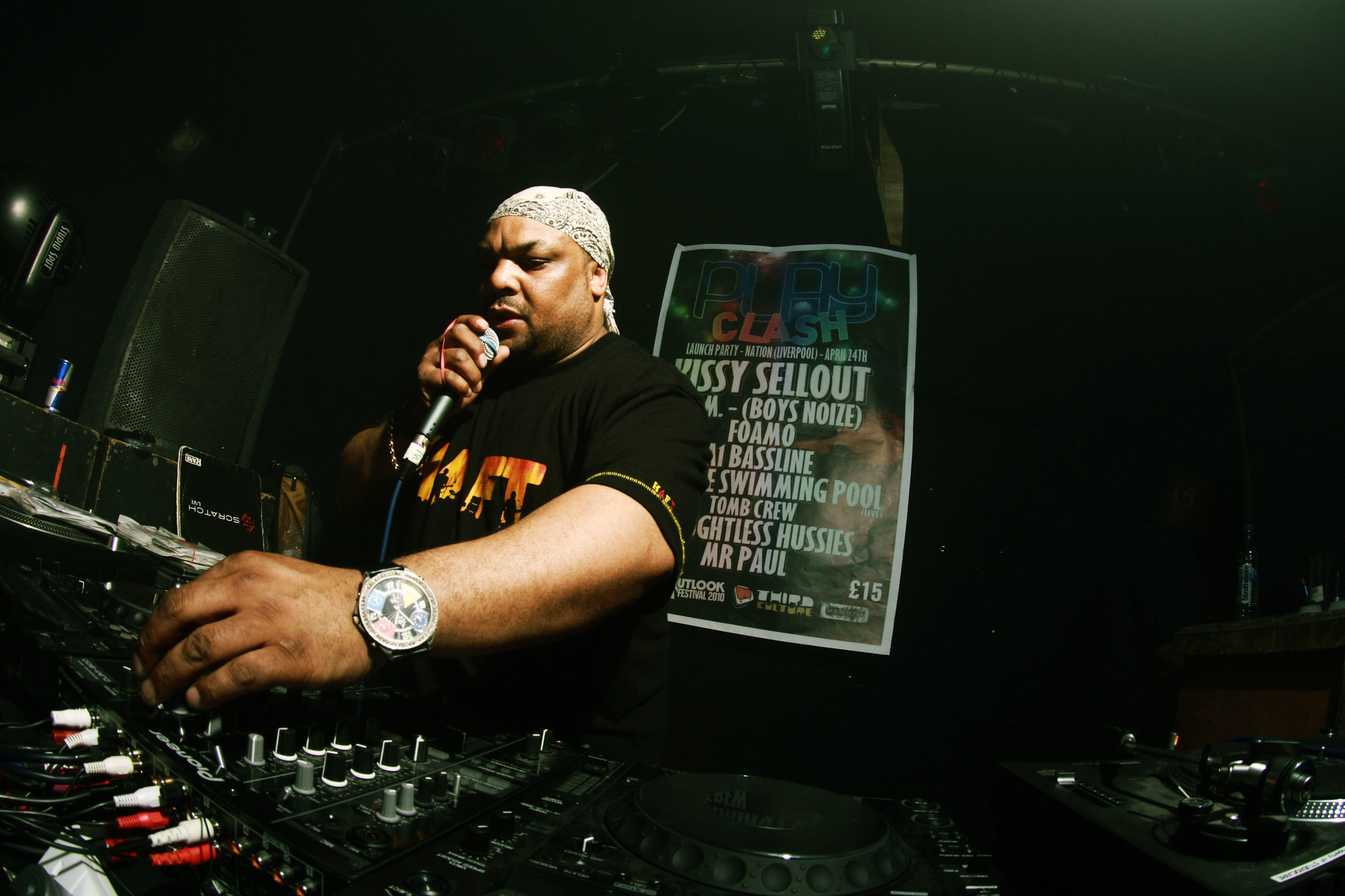

Background information
- Origin: Leeds, England
- Genres: Dub, reggae
- Years active: 1990–present
- Website: irationsteppas.co.uk

Iration Steppas is a UK-based sound system and dub music production collective from Leeds, England. Founded in the early 1990s by Mark Iration, the group took its current form in 1993 when he was joined by partner Dennis Rootical. Their musical style combines traditional Jamaican dub with electronic influences and deep bass frequencies. They are associated with the evolution of the UK dub movement, particularly the "steppers" style.

Iration Steppas have gained a strong following in the UK and internationally, performing at dub and reggae festivals and other major events such as Kallida Festival, Timeless Festival, Reggae Geel, Glastonbury Festival, Kendal Calling, Lovebox Festival, Outlook festival, Positive Vibration, and Primavera Sound. They have collaborated with a range of artists and producers, including Johnny Clarke, Burning Spear, U-Roy, Brigadier Jerry and O.B.F. Sound System.

== Documentary ==
In 2022, Dubquake Records (O.B.F. Sound System) released the film Ina Vanguard Style, which documents the history of the sound system and its role in the dub music scene.

== Discography ==
=== Albums ===
- Dubz from De Higher Regionz (2004)
- 90s Classic Cutz Package (2021)

== See also ==
- Music in Leeds
