= George Jones (radio presenter) =

Musician and radio and TV personality from Belfast

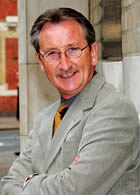
- Occupations: Musician, radio and TV personality

George Jones (born 1941, Bloomfield, East Belfast) is a musician and former radio and TV personality from Belfast, Northern Ireland.

Jones started entertaining in the showbands era in Northern Ireland. Jones is a founder member of the long-running showband Clubsound.

== Early life ==
Jones was born and brought up in Greenville Street in the Bloomfield area of east Belfast, attending Elmgrove Primary School. His father came from Scarva and his mother's family background was Scottish. He has one sister, Lally, whom he credits as the major influence on his musical development.

== Music career ==
As a teenager, Jones was a member of the band the Monarchs which included his boyhood friend, Van Morrison. The Monarchs toured Europe for three months as the International Monarchs before returning to Belfast and disbanding. Jones moved to comedy cabaret by forming the well-known band Clubsound.

== Radio career ==
Jones' first break into radio came with a Sunday slot on Downtown Radio. He went on to work for BBC Northern Ireland, and had his own show, Just Jones, for Radio Ulster, which won him a Sony Radio Academy Award for best local radio presenter.

In June 2006, after twenty-one years of presenting Just Jones, he was dropped from the line-up on BBC Radio Ulster. He presented his last afternoon show on 30 June 2006.

After the BBC radio show ended, Jones started to present on Sunday mornings on U105 and as of January 2007 he presented his own daily afternoon show on the same station. He then presented the Sunday night show on U105, Sunday Sizzler, until early 2012. He returned to Downtown Radio with his Drivetime show before hosting a mid afternoon daily show on the station. He presented his last show on Downtown on 25 March 2014.

In August 2016 Jones returned to present a radio show on an internet radio station in Northern Ireland called "Fever40".

== Television career ==
Jones has also appeared on television shows such as Town Challenge and Children in Need.

== Other projects ==
In April 2010 Jones took a place on the Irish Comedy Tour Give My Head Peace.

Jones has also starred in the Irish musical, On Eagles Wing (later On Irish Wings) along with Peter Corry.

== Personal life ==
Jones and his wife, Hilary live in Greyabbey and have a son, Jason (Jay) Jones and a daughter, Natalie.
