= Judith R. Cohen =

Canadian ethnomusicologist, music educator, performer

- Born: Judith Rita Cohen; December 9, 1949 (age 76); Montreal, Quebec, Canada
- Occupations: ethnomusicologist, music educator, performer
- Children: 1

Academic background
- Education: B.A., English Literature, McGill University (1971); B.F.A., Music, Concordia University (1975); M.A., Medieval Studies, University of Montreal (1980); PhD, Ethnomusicology, University of Montreal (1989)
- Thesis: Judeo-Spanish Songs in the Sephardic Communities of Montreal and Toronto: Survival, Function and Change (1988)

Academic work
- Discipline: Ethnomusicology
- Sub-discipline: Medieval music, Judeo-Spanish song, traditional music of the Balkans and French-Canada, pan-European balladry
- Website: judithcohen.ca

Judith Rita Cohen (born December 9, 1949) is a Canadian ethnomusicologist, music educator, and performer. Her research interests include Judeo-Spanish (Ladino) songs; medieval and traditional music from the Balkans, Portugal, French Canada, and Yiddish; pan-European balladry; and songs from Crypto-Jewish regions in Portugal. She has received numerous research and travel grants to do fieldwork in Spain, Portugal, Morocco, Israel, Turkey, Greece, France, Belgium, Canada, and the United States, and has published many journal articles, papers, and book chapters. She plays a variety of medieval musical instruments, and sings and performs as part of her lectures and in concerts and solo recitals. She is also the editor of the Alan Lomax Spanish collection maintained by the Association for Cultural Equity.

== Early life and education ==
Judith Rita Cohen was born in Montreal, Quebec, Canada. Her parents are Canadian-born. Cohen is of Ashkenazi Jewish descent; her family traces its lineage to Lithuania and Latvia.

Cohen was attracted to folk music as a child. In summer camp, she learned Hebrew folk songs from Israel, songs from the U.S. civil rights movement, and songs from American and Canadian folk revivals. After attending Iona Avenue Primary School, a Francophone public school, she directed the folk song club in her high school, and learned French-Canadian and Yiddish folk songs as well.

Cohen earned her B.A. in English Literature at McGill University in 1971. At age 20 she visited Yugoslavia with a friend and became interested in Balkan music; after graduation, she decided to spend a year abroad, hitchhiking through Spain, Morocco, the Balkans, and Turkey, where her interest in traditional Sephardic folk music was kindled. She returned to Canada to earn a B.F.A. in Music at Concordia University in 1975 and an M.A. in Medieval Studies at the University of Montreal in 1980. She submitted her master's thesis on "The Role of Women Musicians in Medieval Spain in the Christian, Jewish and Moslem Communities". She went on to earn her PhD in Ethnomusicology at the University of Montreal in 1989, writing her doctoral dissertation on "Judeo-Spanish Songs in the Sephardic Communities of Montreal and Toronto: Survival, Function and Change". For her fieldwork she interacted with Sephardic Jews who had emigrated to Canada from Morocco and former Ottoman countries.

In 1991 she received a post-doctoral fellowship from the University of Toronto which enabled her to study Judeo-Spanish song in Israel, France, Belgium, New York City, Miami, and Los Angeles. She earned her TESL certificate from the Canadian Centre for Language and Cultural Studies in 1994 and a B.Ed in Secondary French and English from the University of Toronto in 1996.

== Career ==
=== Scholarship ===
There is a Spanish singer who claimed to be singing "an eleventh century Sephardic lullaby". Well, first of all, no one was writing down lullaby melodies – or almost any melodies except early church plainchant – in the eleventh century. And there was no such language as 'Spanish' then – much less Judeo-Spanish. The Judeo-Spanish of the songs people hear is a diaspora language.

— Judith R. Cohen

Cohen is noted as one of the first scholars to develop a specialty in the traditional music of the Sephardic Jewish diaspora. She has received numerous research and travel grants enabling her to study Judeo-Spanish folk music traditions in Spain and among Crypto-Jews in villages in Portugal; other grants have funded her fieldwork in Morocco, Israel, Turkey, Greece, France, Belgium, Canada, and the United States. She has made an effort to dispel the popular myth that Sephardic songs have medieval origins and are unique to Sephardic Jews. She explains that the majority of Judeo-Spanish songs were composed after the expulsion of Jews from Spain, and that both melodies and instrumentation were often borrowed from the neighboring non-Jewish culture.

Among Cohen's research topics is how Judeo-Spanish songs and customs have been incorporated into modern-day festivals, such as the Festa da Istoria in Ribadavia, Galicia, Spain and the "Jewish Festival" in Hervás, Extremadura, Spain. She has also branched out into studies of gender roles in Judeo-Spanish song and Iberian women's drumming. Her fieldwork among Crypto-Jews in communities such as Belmonte and Trás-os-Montes is more circumspect due to the secrecy and suspicion engrained in their lifestyle. Having befriended several families, she and her daughter have been invited to share meals with them, join their prayers (though not to record them), and participate in Passover celebrations. As part of her fieldwork, Cohen also solicits non-Jews for their opinions about Jews and their country's musical traditions.

Cohen's research work extends to medieval music, traditional music from the Balkans and French-Canada, and pan-European balladry. In 2000, Cohen began studying Alan Lomax's Spanish folk-music recordings from 1952. She traveled to Spain to do field research and recorded and interviewed many of the singers (or their descendants) that Lomax had taped. In 2011, Cohen won the first Alan Lomax Fellowship in Folklife Studies from the Library of Congress to prepare Lomax's 1952 fieldwork diary for publication. She is now the editor of the Lomax Spanish collection maintained by the Association for Cultural Equity. She has written detailed liner notes for CD collections of Lomax's dance tunes and ballads from many regions of Spain under the Franco regime.

The Judith R. Cohen Collection at the United States Holocaust Memorial Museum contains "digital sound recordings of English and Ladino songs, oral testimony, radio programs, and academic presentation examples" which Cohen compiled in her research of the Sephardic refugee community in Montreal.

Cohen has presented papers at many international conferences. She was the keynote speaker for the 2004 conference of the International Society for the Study of Medievalism.

=== Teaching ===
Cohen was a part-time lecturer at Concordia University from 1977 to 1981. In 1981, she produced a Manual of Early Medieval Music Notation for a course taught by Professor Wolfgang Bottenberg at Concordia. Cohen taught medieval music at The Royal Conservatory of Music in Toronto from 1983 to 1988, and worked as an itinerant music instructor in recorder for the Toronto Board of Education from 1986 to 1990.

Cohen joined the faculty of York University as a part-time instructor in 1990. Since 1993, she has been a member of the Adjunct Graduate Faculty of the Department of Music. She has taught courses in music history and directed a Renaissance and medieval ensemble and a world music chorus as credit courses at the university. Cohen was a visiting lecturer at Hebrew University of Jerusalem in 1993 and a visiting faculty member at the University of Extremadura, Spain, in spring 2000–2004.

She has led workshops, seminars, and courses for both adults and children.

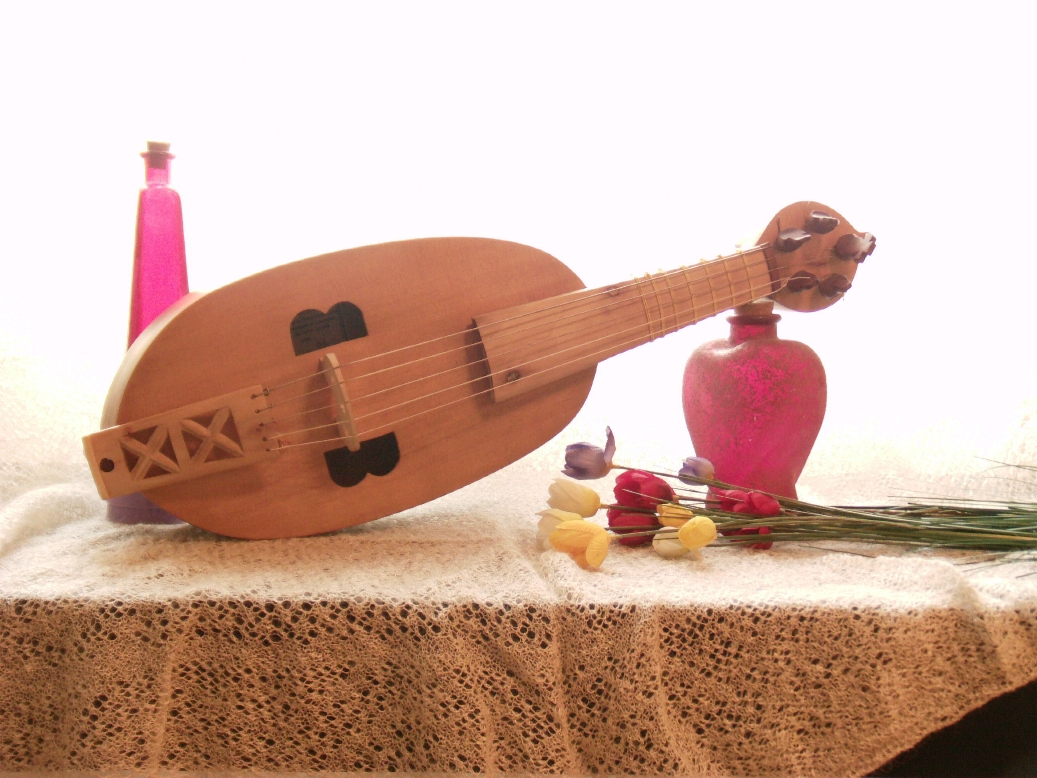
Modern build of a vielle from Galicia, Spain

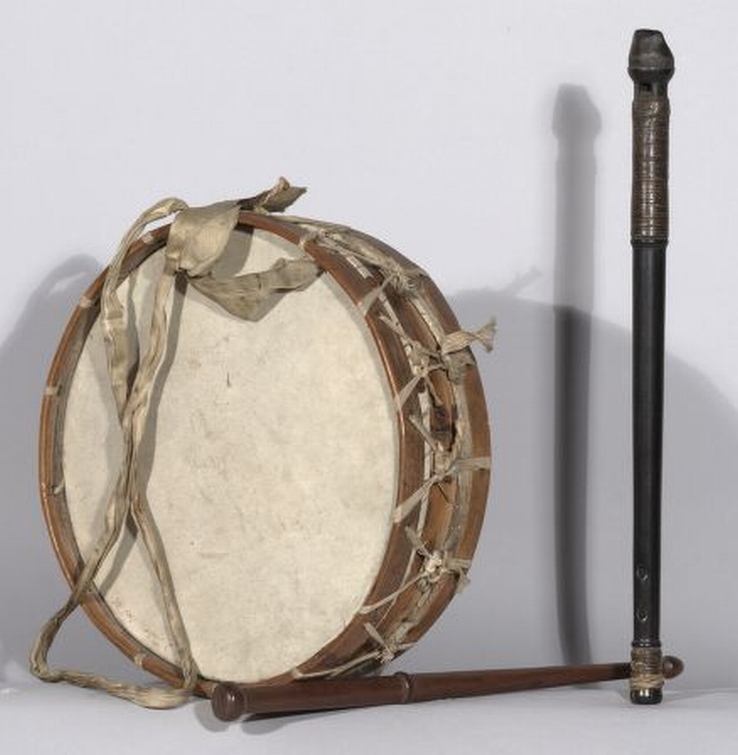
Pipe and tabor

=== Music ===
As part of her fieldwork, Cohen learns traditional folk tunes and then performs them in concerts, festivals, and solo recitals. After learning several traditional Portuguese village songs, for example, she gave a concert at the Portuguese Consulate in Toronto. She often performs in concert with her daughter, Tamar Ilana, in Spain, Portugal, and other locales, and they have recorded albums together. Cohen's solo performances have been broadcast on CBC Radio and on Radio Communautaire Juive in Paris.

Cohen plays a variety of medieval musical instruments, including the vielle (medieval fiddle), oud (Middle Eastern lute), pandeiro (square frame drum), derbukka, mountain dulcimer, pipe and tabor, hand percussion, and medieval wind and stringed instruments. Her repertoire includes medieval music and traditional songs from Spanish, Portuguese, Sephardic, Balkan, Yiddish, and French-Canadian music traditions. Cohen played recorder and percussion on the 1981 album Les flûtes canadiennes by Chris Rawlings.

Cohen frequently incorporates songs and instrumental performance into her lectures on Judeo-Spanish, Yiddish, Hispanic, Canadian, French, Balkan, and medieval musical traditions.

From 1976 to 1984, Cohen was the director of the Sanz Cuer Ensemble, a medieval performance group in Montreal. From 1988 to 1995 she was an instructor for the Balkan Vocal Ensemble at the University of Toronto. In 1981, she became a founding member of Gerineldo, a Sephardic ensemble in Montreal specializing in Moroccan Judeo-Spanish songs. In 1985, she was a judge at the Ottawa Music Festival.

== Memberships and affiliations ==
Cohen is a board member and past president of the Canadian Society for Traditional Music. She holds memberships in the Folklore and Ethnography Studies Association of Canada, American Folklore Society, Iberian Ethnomusicology Society, International Council for Traditional Music, Society for Ethnomusicology, Society for Crypto-Judaic Studies, European Association for Jewish Studies, International Society for Sephardic Studies, the Canadian branch of the American Federation of Musicians, and the Ontario Folk Dance Association.

== Awards ==
For her Radio Canada program "Dans mon chemin j'ai rencontré: Songs of Meetings and Travelling", accompanied by her daughter, Cohen won the Prix Marcel Blouin in 1994. A CD of the program was released in 1997.

== Personal life ==
With her former partner, Robert S. Adams, a Native Canadian (Cree-Saulteaux) with Romanian and Scottish ancestry, Cohen has one daughter, Tamar Ilana Cohen Adams (born 1986). Tamar Ilana began accompanying her mother on fieldwork research trips to Spain and other locales from the age of 4; she has since become a professional flamenco dancer, singer, and music educator, and often performs with her mother in concerts and recordings.

Cohen is fluent in English, French, Spanish, and Portuguese.

== Selected discography ==
Cohen has released recordings of traditional music and song based on her scholarship and fieldwork. These include:

- Sefarad en Diáspora, 2006
- Canciones de Sefarad: Empezar quiero contar (Songs of Sepharad: "I'll begin the story..."), 2000
- Dans mon chemin j'ai rencontré (On My Way I Met), 1997
- Con Viela y Mochila, Madrid (With Fiddle and Backpack, Madrid), 1991
- Primavera en Salonica: Canciones de los Sefardíes y sus Vecinos (Spring in Salonica: Songs of the Sephardim and Their Neighbors), 1992
- 1492-1992 Revisited: The Sephardic Song "Revival", 1992

== Selected bibliography ==
=== Articles ===
- Cohen, Judith R. (Spring 2011). "'No so komo las de agora' (I'm not like those modern girls): Judeo-Spanish songs meet the twenty-first century". European Judaism. 44 (1): 151–164. doi:10.3167/ej.2011.44.01.15. JSTOR 41444107.
- Cohen, Judith R. (2010). "Judeo-Spanish song: A Mediterranean-wide interactive tradition" (PDF). Revista Transcultural de Música (14). Sociedad de Etnomusicología: 1–8. (English translation)
- Cohen, Judith R.; Bresler, Joel (2009). "The Music of the Sephardim" (PDF). Early Music America. 15 (4): 61–2, 64.
- Alexander, Tamar; Bentolila, Yaakov; Şarhon, Karen Gerson; Papo, Eliezer (2009). "'Maria, sister of Aaron, play your tambourine': Music in the Lives of Crypto-Jewish Women in Portugal". El Prezente: Studies in Sephardic Culture. 3: 293–314. ISBN 978-965-91164-2-3.
- Cohen, Judith R. (2008). "'This Drum I Play': Women and Square Frame Drums in Portugal and Spain". Ethnomusicology Forum. 17 (1): 95–124. doi:10.1080/17411910801972966. S2CID 194014712.
- Cohen, Judith R. (July–August 2003). "Sephardic Song". Midstream – via Questia.
- Cohen, Judith R. (1999). "Constructing a Spanish Jewish Festival: Music and the appropriation of tradition". The World of Music. 41 (3): 85–113. JSTOR 41699293.
- Cohen, Judith R. (1993). "Sonography of Judeo-Spanish Song (Cassettes, LPs, CDs, Video, Film)". Jewish Folklore and Ethnology Review. 15 (2): 49–55.
- Cohen, Judith R. (1993a). "Women and Judeo-Spanish Music". Bridges. 3 (2): 113–9. JSTOR 40357602.
- Cohen, Judith R. (1987). "The Lighter Side of Judeo-Spanish Traditional Songs: Some Canadian examples". Canadian Folk Music Journal. 15: 25–34.
- Anahory-Librowicz, Oro; Cohen, Judith R. (1986). "Modalidades expresivas de los cantos de boda judeo-españoles" [Expressive Modalities of Judeo-Spanish Wedding Songs]. Revista de Dialectología y Tradiciones Populares (in Spanish). 41: 189–209.
- Cohen, Judith R. (August 1985). "La vida institucional sefardita en Canadà" [Sephardic Institutional Life in Canada]. Sefardica. 2 (3).

=== Papers ===
- Cohen, Judith R. (2004). "'E Com Razões de Ladino: Judeo-Spanish song as identity marker, from Iberian Neo-Sephardic activities to the Internet". In Pomeroy, Hilary S.; Alpert, Michael (eds.). Proceedings of the Twelfth British Conference on Judeo-Spanish Studies, 24-26 June, 2001: Sephardic Language, Literature and History. BRILL. p. 166. ISBN 9789004139565.
- Cohen, Judith R. (1999). "Music and the Re/Construction of 20th Century Iberian Crypto-Jewish Identity". Jewish Studies at the Turn of the Twentieth Century: Proceedings of the 6th EAJS Congress, Toledo, July 1998. BRILL. p. 282. ISBN 9789004115583.
- Cohen, Judith R. (1993b). "'Just Harmonizing It In Their Own Way': Change and reaction in Judeo-Spanish Song". Revista de Musicología. 3 (3). La Sociedad: 1578–1596. doi:10.2307/20796016. JSTOR 20796016.
- Cohen, Judith R. (1991), "The impact of mass media and acculturation on the Judeo-Spanish song tradition in Montreal", in Frith, Simon (ed.), World Music, Politics and Social Change: Papers from the International Association for the Study of Popular Music, Manchester University Press, p. 90, ISBN 9780719028793

=== Book chapters ===
- Cohen, Judith R. (2019), "'We've Always Sung It That Way': Re/Appropriation of Medieval Spanish Jewish Culture in a Galician Town", in Beckwith, Stacy N. (ed.), Charting Memory: Recalling Medieval Spain, Routledge, p. 29, ISBN 9781135682576
- Cohen, Judith R. (2011), "Portuguese Crypto-Jews and constructed musical identities", Mise en scène des territoires musicaux: Tourisme, patrimoine et performance, Presses de l'Université de Montréal, pp. 325–338, ISBN 9782760622463
- Cohen, Judith R. (2009), "Humor and Satire in Judeo-Spanish Song", in Ehrlich, M. Avrum (ed.), Encyclopedia of the Jewish Diaspora: Origins, Experiences, and Culture, vol. 2, ABC-CLIO, p. 220, ISBN 9781851098736
- Cohen, Judith R. (2009), "Music and the Reconstruction of Iberian Crypto-Jewish Identity", in Ehrlich, M. Avrum (ed.), Encyclopedia of the Jewish Diaspora: Origins, Experiences, and Culture, vol. 2, ABC-CLIO, p. 222, ISBN 9781851098736
- Cohen, Judith R. (1995), "Women's Roles in Judeo-Spanish Song Traditions", in Sacks, Maurie (ed.), Active Voices: Women in Jewish Culture, University of Illinois Press, p. 182, ISBN 9780252064531
- Cohen, Judith R. (1987), "Ya Salió de la Mar: Judeo-Spanish wedding songs among Moroccan Jews in Canada", in Koskoff, Ellen (ed.), Women and Music in Cross-Cultural Perspective, University of Illinois Press, p. 55, ISBN 9780252060571
- Cohen, Judith R. (1990), "Musical Bridges: The Contrafact Tradition in Judeo-Spanish Songs", in Gerson, Frederick; Percival, Anthony (eds.), Cultural Marginality in the Western Mediterranean, New Aurora Editions, pp. 121–7

== Sources ==
- Ehrlich, M. Avrum, ed. (2009). Encyclopedia of the Jewish Diaspora: Origins, Experiences, and Culture. Vol. 2. ABC-CLIO. ISBN 9781851098736.
- Holmes, Gillian, ed. (1999). Who's Who of Canadian Women, 1999-2000. University of Toronto Press. ISBN 9780920966556.
