= Montreal International Reggae Festival =

Coordinates: 45°30′18″N 73°33′36″W

The Montreal Reggae Festival is a reggae (music) festival held annually at the Old Port of Montreal, during the 2nd weekend of July.

Founded in 2004, by Eric Blagrove (President: 2004–present), Ricardo Forbes (Vice-President: 2004–2008), and Cezar Brumeanu (Producer: 2004–2008), the Montreal Reggae Fest was a three-day weekend-long, three stage event.

The 2014 festival will include performances from Sean Paul, Demarco, I-Octane, Maxi Priest, Sanchez, Marcia Griffiths, and Percy Sledge

The festival took a hiatus in 2018 and is expected to be back in 2019.

== See also ==
- List of reggae festivals
- Reggae
