= Reggae Rising =

Annual reggae music festival

- Genre: Reggae
- Dates: August
- Locations: Humboldt County, California
- Years active: 2007-2009
- Founders: Tom Dimmick, People Productions
- Attendance: 12,400+ (2007)

Reggae Rising was an annual reggae festival in Humboldt County, California which took place on the first full weekend of August along the banks of the Eel River. Performers at the 2008 edition of Reggae Rising, which took place August 1–3, 2008 at Dimmick Ranch and French's Camp included Sizzla, Julian Marley, Junior Reid, UB40, Tanya Stephens, and Sly and Robbie. The 2010 festival was canceled due to the financial trouble of the organizer, Tom Dimmick, resulting in his denial of a Conditional Use Permit by the Humboldt County Planning Commission. The organizer never contacted the Humboldt County Planning Commission for a 2011 permit, and as a result, 2009 Reggae Rising marked the end of the Reggae Rising festival.

== History ==
Reggae Rising's first year was 2007 when it was produced by People Productions and had 12,400 attendees. Performers at the first year of Reggae Rising included Steel Pulse, Damian Marley, Stephen Marley, Anthony B, Heavyweight Dub Champion, and Ziggy Marley. People Productions also organized the 2008 event, while Dimmick Ranch produced in 2009.

Ultimately, no Reggae Rising festival took place after 2009.

=== Litigation ===
The festival's success was due largely to the popularity of Reggae on the River, a festival that had also been produced by People Productions at a nearby location since 1984 as a benefit for the Mateel Community Center of Redway, California. Mateel Community Center is not affiliated with "Reggae Rising". In 2007 the parties were in litigation over the future of both events. A settlement was reached wherein People Productions agreed to make several payments to Mateel Community Center totalling $500,000. Ultimately the payments were made to the Mateel in full by the Dimmick Ranch.

== See also ==
- List of reggae festivals
- Reggae on the River
