= Festival Reggae Donn Sa =

Reggae Donn sa
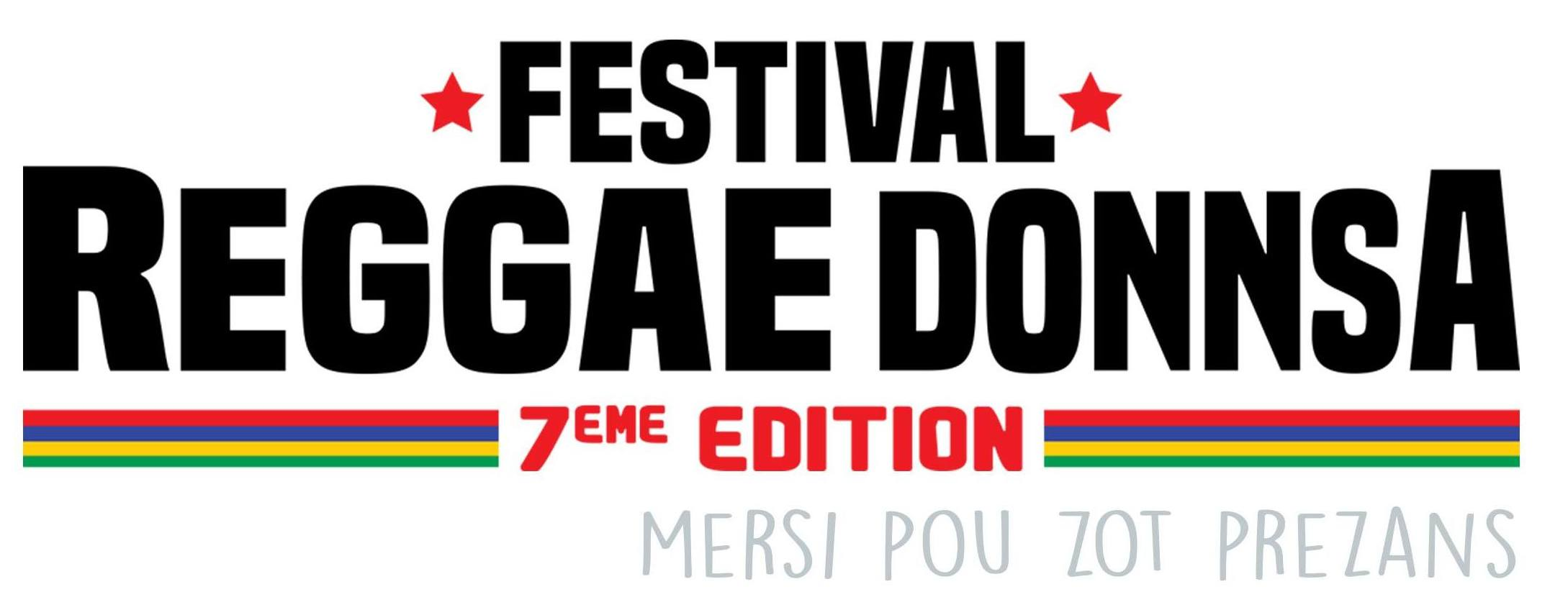
- Genre: Reggae
- Location: Mauritius
- Years active: 2005-present
- Founders: OSB Co Ltd, Live N Direk Entertainment

Reggae Donn sa is a reggae music festival held in Mauritius. Reggae Donn sa was first held in 2005, and has since become one of the largest Reggae music festival in the Indian Ocean.

== History ==
=== Editions ===
Year	No. Visitors	Date	Headliners	Location
2017		13 May	Gentleman, Rass Natty Baby, Linzy Bacbotte, The Prophecy, Jason Heerah, Lin	Stade Germain Comarmond, Bambous
2011		5 November	Special Women Edition Etana, Linzy Bacbotte, Malkijah, Laydee, Jahna Ranks, Grace Barbe	Stade Germain Comarmond, Bambous
2010		27 November	Nuttea, Yaniss Odua, Shao Boana, Malkijah, Menwar, OSB Crew, Ras Minik ek Cool Is I, Rasinn, Chalice Man, Ras Ricky, Mercenary	Stade Germain Comarmond, Bambous
2009	18,000	9 May	Tiken Jah Fakoly, OSB Crew, Rasinn, MDZ, Jakim, Mr. Snype	Stade Anjalay
2008		26 April	Morgan Heritage, OSB Crew, Ras Nininn, Blackowes, Ras Ricky, Jahrimba, Linzy Bacbotte Tian	Stade Anjalay
2006		6 May	Steel Pulse, Ras Ricky, Natir Chamarel, Tian, DaggerKilla, Ras Mayul, OSB Crew, Blacrod Brothers	Stade Sir Gaëtan Duval, Rose-Hill
2005		13 August	Daddy Mory, Pierpoljak, Natir Chamarel, OSB Crew, Tian	Maryse Justin Stadium, Reduit
