= Uppsala Reggae Festival =

Music festival

- Genre: Reggae
- Dates: 26 - 17 July 2024
- Location(s): Uppsala, Sweden
- Years active: 2001-present
- Founders: Yared Tekeste & Adiam Kubrom
- Attendance: 10,000 attendees+
- Website: Uppsala Reggae Festival Official Website

Uppsala Reggae Festival is the largest reggae festival in Scandinavia. It was first held in 2001, but the name was used as early as 1995.

== History ==
The festival was held each August in Uppsala, 70 km north of Stockholm, until 2011.

It took place in Gävle in 2012 and 2013.

After a six year long hiatus, the festival was held in Uppsala again in 2017 but only lasted one day, as opposed to two or three days in the past.

The festival returned in 2018, this time lasting two days and a who's who in reggae line up with Jimmy Cliff, Alborosie, Tarrus Riley, Konshens, Protoje and more.

2019 saw the festival returning to Fyrishov, the original venue where it had started out in 2001.

It was not held in 2020 and 2021.

== See also ==
- List of reggae festivals
- Reggae
- Rastafari
