= Positive Vibration (festival) =

Positive Vibration - Festival of Reggae
- Genre: Reggae Dub
- Location(s): Baltic Triangle, Liverpool, United Kingdom
- Years active: 2016-2019, 2021—present
- Website: posvibefest.com

Positive Vibration - Festival of Reggae is a festival based in Liverpool (UK), which celebrates and showcases reggae music and Jamaican culture.

The festival originated in 2013 as a smaller event held at The Kazimier Garden, before moving to the Baltic Triangle in 2015. In 2016, it expanded into a full two-day festival, marking a significant step in its growth. Since then, Positive Vibration has continued to establish itself as a key reggae festival in the UK, attracting renowned artists and celebrating the influence of Jamaican culture through music, arts, and workshops.

== Line Ups ==
- 2016: Mad Professor, Don Letts, Trojan Records Sound System, DJ Vadim, Levi Tafari, Cut Capers, Shanty, Backbeat Sound System, Solko, Kioko, Rumjig
- 2017: The Selecter, Jah Shaka, Scientist, Channel One Sound System, Don Letts, Reggae Roast, Aba Shanti-I, Earl Gateshead, MC Brother Culture, Prince Fatty, Horseman, Vibronics, Dennis Bovell, Saxon Sound System, Sir Coxsone Outernational Sound System, Dubmatix, Soul Jazz Records Sound System, DJ Andy Smith, Hempolics, Mykaell Riley, John Robb, Levi Tafari, Sinai Sound System, I-mitri CounterAction, New Town Kings, Backbeat Sound System, Ras Kwame, Mount Nakara, One A Penny Sound System, Western Promise, Golty Farabeau
- 2018: Lee "Scratch" Perry + Subatomic Sound System, Roni Size, Macka B, Sister Nancy + Legal Shot Sound System, Adrian Sherwood + Creation Rebel, Mungo's Hi Fi + Eva Lazarus, Dub Pistols, Channel One Sound System, Dreadzone, Iration Steppas w/ Murray Man, Misty in Roots, Capital Letters, Brukout feat. Rory Stone Love + Seani B, Carroll Thompson, Horseman, King Lorenzo, The Upper Cut Band, Don Letts, Blacker Dread, Manudigital, Parly B, Dubkasm, Solo Banton, Radikal Guru, Echo Ranks, Cian Finn, Sinai Sound System, Resonators, Tru Thoughts Records w/ Rodney P + DJ Skitz, Wrongtom, Levi Tafari, John Robb, Samson Sounds, Dr Les Henry, Count Skylarkin, The Majestic, Baked A La Ska, Ruff Trade
- 2019: Fallow year
- 2020: Due to the disruption caused by Covid-19, the festival was postponed until 2021.
- 2021: Asian Dub Foundation, The Twinkle Brothers, Mad Professor Ft. Sister Aisha, Gentleman's Dub Club, Dawn Penn, Hollie Cook, Zion Train, Tippa Irie, Congo Natty Ft. Congo Dubz & Iron Dread, General Levy & Joe Ariwa, Don Letts, Channel One, Horseman & The Upper Cut Band, Mungo's Hi Fi Ft. Charlie P, Benjamin Zephaniah & The Revolutionary Minds, Ruts DC, Kiko Bun, From the Specials - Neville Staple Band, Krafty Kuts Ft. Dynamite MC, Jah Wobble & The Invaders of the Heart, Iration Steppas Ft. Murray Man, The Nextmen Ft. Gardna, DJ Vadim Ft. Jman, O.B.F Ft. Sr. WIlson, Sinai Sound System, KIOKO, Aleighcia Scott, Future Dub Orchestra, Oxman, Adam Prescott, Dub Link Up Ft. MC Mad-X, Count Skylarkin', Kingston Express, Levi Tafari, Rubber Dub

== Awards ==
- Winner of the UK's Best New Festival Award 2016 (UK Festival Awards)
