= Natural Black =

- Born: Mortimer Softley; 16 March 1975 (age 51); Georgetown, Guyana
- Origin: Bachelors Adventure, Guyana
- Genres: Reggae
- Occupations: Singer-songwriter, musician
- Years active: 1995–present
- Label: Vizion Sounds Records

Mortimer Softley (born 16 March 1975), better known by his stage name Natural Black, is a reggae singer from Guyana.

== Biography ==
Mortimer Softley was born in Georgetown, Guyana. He moved to Jamaica in 1995 to pursue his dream of being a reggae singer. In Guyana he hailed from Linden in the community of Albouystown and was nicknamed Black and White because of his love for dressing in those colours. In Jamaica, he was renamed Natural Black by the musicians he hung around. When he first arrived in Jamaica, he worked as a welder and coffee picker while recording in his spare time for various producers. He made the rounds voicing for the likes of Anthony Red Rose, Gordon Lee, Jack Scorpio, Freddie McGregor and Beres Hammond. Only a few of the songs that he recorded were released, and even these suffered from a lack of promotion. His fortunes however began to change when in 2000 he met Roger Grant, a young producer just starting his label Organic Records. This association resulted in two singles, "With Feeling" and "Bad Mind" which brought him his first taste of success. Both songs charted followed by in the Streetz' "Never Leave You Lonely" which peaked at number three on the Star charts. Grant became his manager and capitalised on the popularity of the singles by booking him on major shows like Sting, Reggae Sumfest and Rebel Salute. His promising career was further bolstered with frequent touring in France, Switzerland, and Sweden among other territories.

Around this period he also saw the release of his first album Spiritual Food on French label Patate followed by World War on Lionroots. His manager migrated to the US in 2004 and Natural Black scored in 2006 for producer Don Corleon with the chart topping "Far From Reality". He has since failed to maintain a high profile.

Natural Black has fans in the Caribbean, Europe, the United States and Latin America and is currently signed to Vision Sound Studios of Guyana. He's known for his distinctively smooth and mellow voice, developing a unique style of vocals. He was in the forefront of the newroots and culture movement. His prominent collaborators over the years include Organic, King Jammys, 5th Element, Rootsdown, In The Streetz, Lustre Kings, Addis, 321 Strong, Firehouse, Harmony House, Digital B, Lion Paw, Big Yard, Kickin', Young Blood, No Doubt and Maximum Sound, amongst others. He is closely associated with fellow deejays Norris Man and Perfect and often has joint recording sessions with them.

Natural Black continues to tour and has performed on most of the major Reggae shows and festivals such as Uppsala Reggae Festival, Reggae Sumfest, Sting, Rebel Salute, East Fest and others, with his most recent performance being at the Rubadub Thursdays in 2025.

In 2007 he was sentenced to a $2000 fine and 120 hours of community service after pleading guilty to charges of disorderly conduct, indecent language, resisting arrest and being armed with an offensive weapon (a ratchet knife), after being arrested at Norman Manley International Airport. He was arrested again in October that year on suspicion of stealing a car, although he was released after spending seven days in custody.

In May 2012 he cut his locks because he was not living a Rastafarian lifestyle.

== Discography ==
- Spiritual Food (2003) (Organic/Patate)
- World War (2003) (Organic/Lionroots)
- Far From Reality (2006), Greensleeves
- Jah Guide (2007), Greensleeves
- Cool Nuh Black (2007), Vizion
- Love Gonna Conquer Evil (2007), Cousins
- Naturally Black (2008)
- Guardian Angel (2009)
- Hot New Singles (2013)
- No Prejudice (2014)
