= Ottawa Festivals =

Festival organization based in Canada

- Abbreviation: OF
- Formation: 1996
- Type: Festival organization based in Canada
- Legal status: active
- Purpose: advocate and public voice, educator and network
- Headquarters: Ottawa, Ontario, Canada
- Region served: Ottawa, Ontario, Canada
- Members: 53 festivals
- Official language: English, French
- Website: www.ottawafestivals.ca

Ottawa Festivals, is a member-based organization based in Ottawa, Ontario Canada, supporting and promoting the festival industry in the region. Established in 1996, the organization comprises 53 festivals that showcase a diverse range of cultures, arts, and entertainment to the local community.

== History ==
The roots of Ottawa Festivals trace back to the summer of 1994 when four distinct festivals—Ottawa Bluesfest, CKCU Ottawa Folk Festival, Ottawa Chamber Music Festival, and Fete Caribe—emerged with a shared objective of celebrating and sharing various artistic expressions with the community. Recognizing the potential for collaboration and mutual support, these organizations came together to exchange ideas and experiences.

In response to growing public interest in these new festivals, the president of Ottawa Tourism Commission Authority (OTCA) called a meeting in the fall of 1994. The purpose was to establish a communication channel between the festivals and OTCA. During this meeting, it became evident that the festivals shared common interests and a desire to coordinate tourism information and enhance their individual events. As a result, the Ottawa Festival Network was formed, with an initial board comprising prominent figures such as Mark Monahan (Ottawa Bluesfest), Michel Gauthier (Canadian Tulip Festival), Gene Swimmer (Ottawa Folk Festival), and Christine Broughton (OTCA). This initial group laid the foundation for the network's growth and its collaborations with organizations like the Canadian Tourism Commission, City of Ottawa, and Human Resource Development Canada.

In April 1996, the Ottawa Festival Network officially became an incorporated entity, representing a diverse group of not-for-profit member festivals that celebrated various cultures, arts, and entertainment. A significant milestone came in April 2006 when the network commemorated its 10th anniversary with the "Launch of the Festival Season" event. This occasion celebrated Ottawa's festival industry, which had made a substantial contribution to the region's art, culture, and entertainment scene over the past decade. The event introduced a new official name, Ottawa Festivals d'Ottawa, along with a refreshed logo, a 10th-anniversary brochure, and an updated website. It highlighted the industry's growth, its impact on local tourism and the economy.

Before the establishment of Ottawa Festivals, the National Capital Region Festival Network was formed in 1986 as the first collaborative effort by festivals in the area. At that time, festivals were not formally recognized by the City of Ottawa as a means of economic development and tourism promotion. The group, consisting of organizers from various festivals, worked together to advocate for the recognition of festivals as more than just community recreation. With the support of the Culture Division of the City of Ottawa, they developed criteria and established a festival program that allowed festivals to apply for annual funding.

== Festival members ==
- Winterlude
- Ottawa Irish Festival
- Maple Sugar Festival
- Ottawa International Writers Festival - Spring Edition
- Victoria Day Festival
- Canadian Tulip Festival
- Ottawa International Children's Festival
- Ottawa Marathon
- Carnival of Cultures
- Canada Dance Festival
- Magnetic North Theatre Festival
- Italian Week
- Westfest
- Festival Franco Ontarien
- Ottawa Fringe Festival
- Ottawa Dragon Boat Festival
- Summer Solstice Aboriginal Arts Festival
- TD Canada Trust Ottawa International Jazz Festival
- Canada Day Arts Festival
- Unisong Canadian Choir Festival
- Canada Day
- Ottawa Bluesfest
- Sound and Light Show on Parliament Hill/Son et lumière
- HOPE Volleyball Summerfest
- The Great India Festival (formerly, Festival of India)
- Ottawa Turkish Festival
- Orchestras in the Park
- Ottawa International Chamber Music Festival
- Ottawa Lumière Festival
- Navan Fair
- Ottawa Greekfest
- Ottawa Folk Festival
- SuperEx
- Ottawa Reggae Festival
- Capital Pride
- Capital Vélo Fest
- Richmond Fair
- Carp Fair
- Metcalfe Fair
- Fall Rhapsody
- Ontario Council of Folk Festivals Conference
- Ottawa International Animation Festival
- Ottawa International Writers Festival - Fall Edition
- Lebanorama
- Ottawa Storytelling Festival
- Canadian Folk Music Awards
- 3i Summit: Imagine - Interact - Inspire
- Christmas Lights Across Canada
- Festival X
- Music and Beyond
- South Asian Festival
- Summer Fling – A Theatrical Affair!
- Latin Sparks Festival
