= Winter Lights Across Canada =

Federal government initiative

Winter Lights Across Canada, formerly Christmas Lights Across Canada, is an annual federal government Department of Canadian Heritage event "celebrating winter in Canada" which highlights festive decorative sites along Confederation Boulevard in Canada's capital region, as well as various monuments and sites across provincial and territorial capitals across Canada. The month-long event begins in early December and ends in early January of the following calendar year.

The event was established by the National Capital Commission in 1985 under its original name of Christmas Lights Across Canada, and was designed to highlight landmarks and sites including Parliament Hill, national museums, monuments, embassies and other prominent institutions. In 2022, the event was renamed from "Christmas" to "Winter" as unveiled by Heritage Minister Pablo Rodriguez, but the name change was not explained.
