= B.R. Stylers =

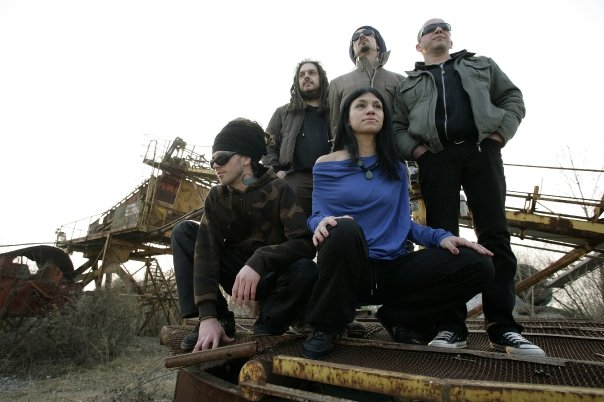
- B.R. Stylers

Background information
- Origin: Pordenone, Italy
- Genres: Reggae/Dub
- Years active: 2000–present
- Label: Alambic Conspiracy
- Website: http://www.brstylers.com

B.R. Stylers is an Italian reggae dub band from Pordenone founded in 2000. Current members are Michela Grena (voice), Paolo Baldini (bass), GP Ennas (drums), Filippo Buresta (keyboards) and Manuel Tomba (mixing).

== Biography ==
Their debut was at Rototom Reggae Sunsplash in summer 2001. They also participated in the compilation Rototom Sunsplash Vol. 1 - Ital Reggae with the song Don't Sleep. B.R. Stylers played at festivals and clubs in Italy, Slovenia, Croatia, Germany and Poland, sharing the stage with artists like Zion Train, Revolutionary Dub Warriors, Jah Free, Mad Professor, Lee "Scratch" Perry, Horace Andy, Africa Unite and Adrian Sherwood
In December 2002 they released their first album Dub Resonance on Slovenian independent label Vinylmania Records.
In 2003 the song One island dub was remixed by London-based dub combo Alpha & Omega and released on their Spirit of The Ancients record.
In 2005 they released Dubbing From The Earth, after the EP Over This Place (summer 2004), recorded, written and arranged by B.R. Stylers at Dub Alchemy studio in Pordenone and mixed by Madaski at Dub The Demon in Turin. The album features Jah Free, Prince Alla, Vibronics and Dubital.
In 2006 Paolo Baldini officially joined the band Africa Unite as a producer and bassist. The album Controlli features Michela Grena's voice in the song Watch Out. B.R. Stylers performed as an opening band for the Controlli Tour. In winter 2008 the band started production for the new album out in April 2009 on Alambic Conspiracy label.

== Discography ==
=== Albums ===
- 2002 Dub Resonance (Vinylmania Records)
- 2004 Over This Place (EP) (Vinylmania Records)
- 2005 Dubbing From The Earth (Alternative - Venus)
- 2009 Indubstria (Alambic Conspiracy)

=== Compilations ===
- 2000 Rototom Sunsplash Vol. 1 - Ital Reggae with the song "Don't Sleep"
- 2001 Suitable#2 with the song "Inna Fusion"
- 2002 Sushi Dub with the song "Inna Fusion Step Mix"
- 2003 Alpha & Omega - Spirit of the Ancients with the song "No More Sadness"
- 2007 4 Riddims 4 Unity with the song "Only One Indication"
- 2008 Dub Community with the song "Jah Plan"
