= Levi Tafari =

British poet and performer

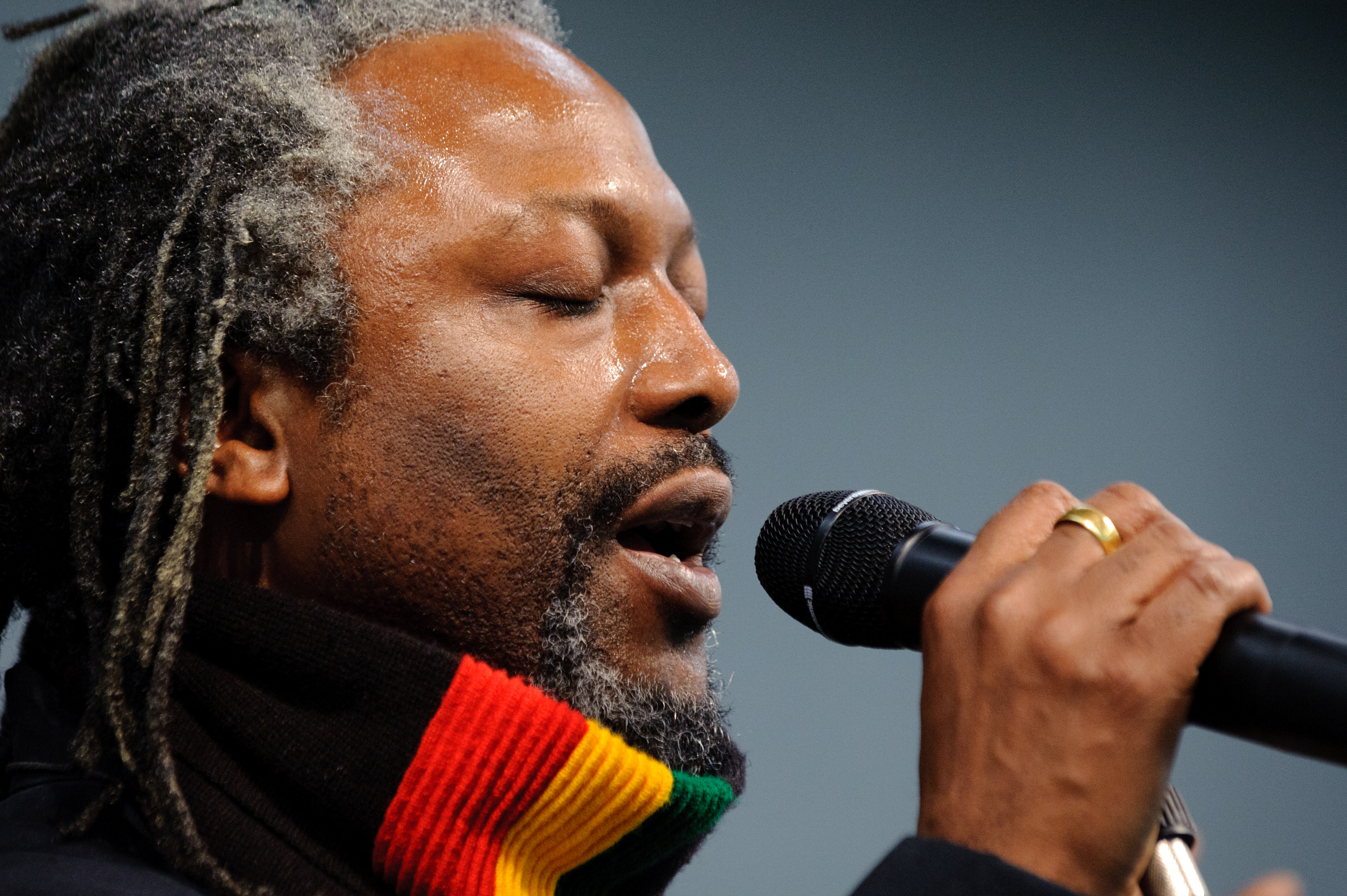
- Levi Tafari
- Born: Liverpool, England
- Occupations: Actor, poet
- Years active: 1987–present
- Employer: Jack Molonue

Levi Tafari is a British poet and performer. He was born and raised in the city of Liverpool by his Jamaican parents. He attended catering college, where he studied classical French cuisine and graduated with distinction. In the early 1980s, while working as a caterer, he started attending the Liverpool 8 Writers Workshop and decided to become a performance poet. Tafari was a firm member of the Rastafari movement and although his early performances were in that community, he saw it as his duty to reach a wider audience and began performing overseas.

Tafari self-identifies as an Urban Griot (the griot being the traditional consciousness raiser, storyteller, newscaster and political agitator). He has four collections of poetry: Duboetry (1987), Liverpool Experience (1989), Rhyme Don’t Pay (1998) and From the Page to the Stage (2006). His plays have been performed at the Blackheath Theatre in Stafford and the Unity Theatre, Liverpool. He was also the first person to use the term "duboetry." Several of his musical tracks can be found on compilation albums and he has recorded poetry, which has been released on audiocassette.

Tafari often runs creative writing workshops at schools, colleges, universities and prisons. Most recently he has applied his work to working with the British Council, undertaking tours to the Czech Republic, Jordan, Portugal, Germany and Singapore. He was Writer in Residence at Charles University in Prague. He has also appeared in many television programs including Blue Peter and Grange Hill. He also made a film about Rastafari for BBC television's Everyman (TV series).

In 2001, Tafari toured with scrap recycle band, Urban Strawberry Lunch. He has also worked with the Ghanaian drum-and-dance ensemble Delado, the Liverpool Philharmonic Orchestra, jazz musician Dennis Rollins, and his own reggae band, Ministry of Love. Currently, Tafari is preparing a new collection of poems, experimenting in the recording studio with new sounds along with guitarist Eiko Falckenberg and he continues to perform his work in venues across the globe.

In early 2009, Tafari worked with children from Elmgrove Primary School in Belfast for their live performance in St George's Market. He attended the performance on 2 April 2009.

In 2023, Tafari became a Citizen of Honour, which was awarded to him at Liverpool Town Hall by Lord Mayor, Cllr Roy Gladden.

== Bibliography ==
- Duboetry (1987)
- Liverpool Experience (1989)
- Rhyme Don't Pay (1998)
- From the Page to the Stage (2006)
- Party Mania (2015)
