= Wonder Dream Concert =

1975 concert held in Jamaica

- Genre: Reggae, rock, etc.
- Dates: October 4, 1975
- Location: National Stadium in Kingston, Jamaica
- Years active: 1975

The Wonder Dream Concert was a concert held on October 4, 1975, at the National Stadium in Kingston, Jamaica. The concert was headlined by Stevie Wonder who was joined on the bill by Bob Marley & The Wailers and his former bandmates Peter Tosh and Bunny Wailer. The concert is sometimes known as the Wailers Reunion Show, as it was only the second time the original Wailers had performed together since 1973 and the last time they ever would. (The original three Wailers also performed together at a concert with the Jackson Five in Kingston at the National Stadium on March 8, 1975.)

The concert was a benefit concert for the Jamaican Institute for the Blind and was opened by Third World. Harold Melvin & The Bluenotes were scheduled to play but did not show

For Stevie Wonder's encore, Stevie called for Bob to join him on stage and they played "I Shot The Sheriff" and "Superstition" together. Another notable moment was the last performance of the original Wailers' first hit "Simmer Down", originally from 1964.

The tracks the Wailers played were (in this order):

- Rastaman Chant
- Nice Time
- Simmer Down
- One Love
- Dream Land
- Fighting Against Convictions
- Mark Of The Beast
- You Can't Blame The Youth
- Legalize It
- So Jah Seh
- No Woman, No Cry
- Jah Live

Stevie Wonder then sang with his band:

- Golden Lady / Too High
- You And I
- Too Shy To Say / As
- All In Love Is Fair
- Don't You Worry 'bout A Thing
- Drum Solo
- Boogie On Reggae Woman
- I Was Made to Love Her
- Earth Angel
- Ain't Too Proud to Beg / I Heard It Through the Grapevine / Uptight (Everything's Alright) / Respect / What'd I Say
- My Cherie Amour
- Fingertips
- You Haven't Done Nothin'
- Living for the City
- You Are the Sunshine of My Life

Then the aforementioned "I Shot The Sheriff" and "Superstition" were performed as Wonder's encore.

== See also ==
- List of reggae festivals
- Reggae
