= List of tourist attractions in Ottawa =

The following is a list of attractions in Ottawa, Ontario, Canada and surrounding area.

== Permanent attractions ==
=== Museums ===
- Billings Estate National Historic Site
- Bytown Museum
- Cameron Highlanders of Ottawa Museum
- Canada Agriculture Museum
- Canada Aviation and Space Museum
- Canada Science and Technology Museum
- Canadian Museum of History - located in Gatineau, includes the Canadian Children's Museum
- Canadian Museum of Nature
- Canadian War Museum
- City of Ottawa Art Galleries - includes ASP, Barbara Ann Scott, Centrepointe Theatre, City Hall, Gallery 112, Karsh-Masson, Studio and Trinity galleries
- Currency Museum - in the Bank of Canada
- Diefenbunker - at CFS Carp
- Governor General's Foot Guards Regimental Museum
- Laurier House
- Muséoparc Vanier Museopark
- National Gallery of Canada
- Nepean Museum
- Ottawa Art Gallery
- Ottawa Sports Hall of Fame
- Pinhey's Point Historic Site
- Portrait Gallery of Canada
- Swords and Ploughshares Museum
- Watson's Mill
- Workers’ History Museum

==== Defunct museums ====
- Canada and the World Pavilion
- Canadian Museum of Contemporary Photography - closed in 2006, collections now at the National Gallery of Canada
- Canadian Postal Museum - closed in 2012
- Canadian Ski Museum - moved to Mont Tremblant, Quebec 2013
- Wheelhouse Maritime Museum (1968-1976) - collection transferred to Canadian Museum of Science and Technology from 1976-1990, then Marine Museum of the Great Lakes in 1990

=== Children attractions ===
- Canadian Children's Museum

=== Other public areas ===
- Byward Market
- Canadian Tribute to Human Rights
- Capital Pathway
- Dominion Arboretum
- Dow's Lake
- Lansdowne Park - home of the Aberdeen Pavilion and TD Place
- National Arts Centre
- National War Memorial - also called "The Response", home of the Canadian Tomb of the Unknown Soldier
- Parliament Hill
- Peacekeeping Monument
- Rideau Canal
- Royal Canadian Navy Monument

=== Notable buildings and private areas ===
Some of these places allow members of the public to visit, but are not completely open to everyone.

- 24 Sussex Drive
- Britannia Yacht Club
- Delegation of the Ismaili Imamat
- Global Centre for Pluralism
- Library and Archives Canada
- Nepean Sailing Club
- Ottawa Hunt and Golf Club
- Rideau Hall
- Royal Canadian Mint
- STV Black Jack
- Supreme Court of Canada

== Festivals and other events ==
- Canada Dance Festival
- Canadian Tulip Festival
- Capital Hoedown
- Capital Idea!
- Capital Pride
- Carnival of Cultures
- Festival of India, Ottawa
- Inside Out Film and Video Festival
- International Folkloric Festival
- Juno Awards of 2012, 2017
- Latin Sparks Festival
- Maple Sugar Festival
- Music and Beyond
- Ottawa Bluesfest
- Ottawa Chamberfest
- Ottawa Dragon Boat Race Festival
- Ottawa Folk Festival
- Ottawa Fringe Festival
- Ottawa International Animation Festival
- Ottawa International Children's Festival
- Ottawa International Film Festival
- Ottawa International Hockey Festival
- Ottawa International Jazz Festival
- Ottawa International Writers Festival
- Ottawa Irish Festival
- Ottawa Reggae Festival
- Rideau Canal Festival
- Westfest
- Winterlude

== Map of major buildings ==
A map of downtown Ottawa, including parts of Lower Town, Sandy Hill, and downtown Hull.
Click on the stars to read articles on individual buildings.

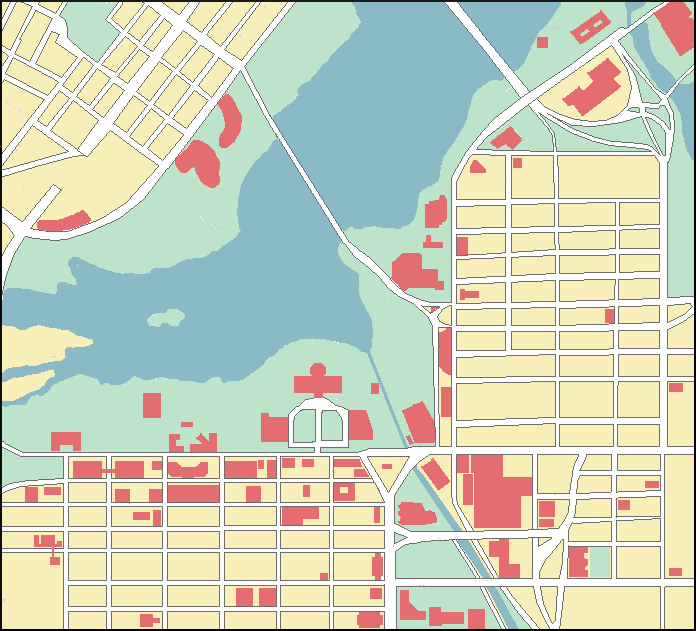
