= List of festivals in Ottawa =

Festivals of Ottawa
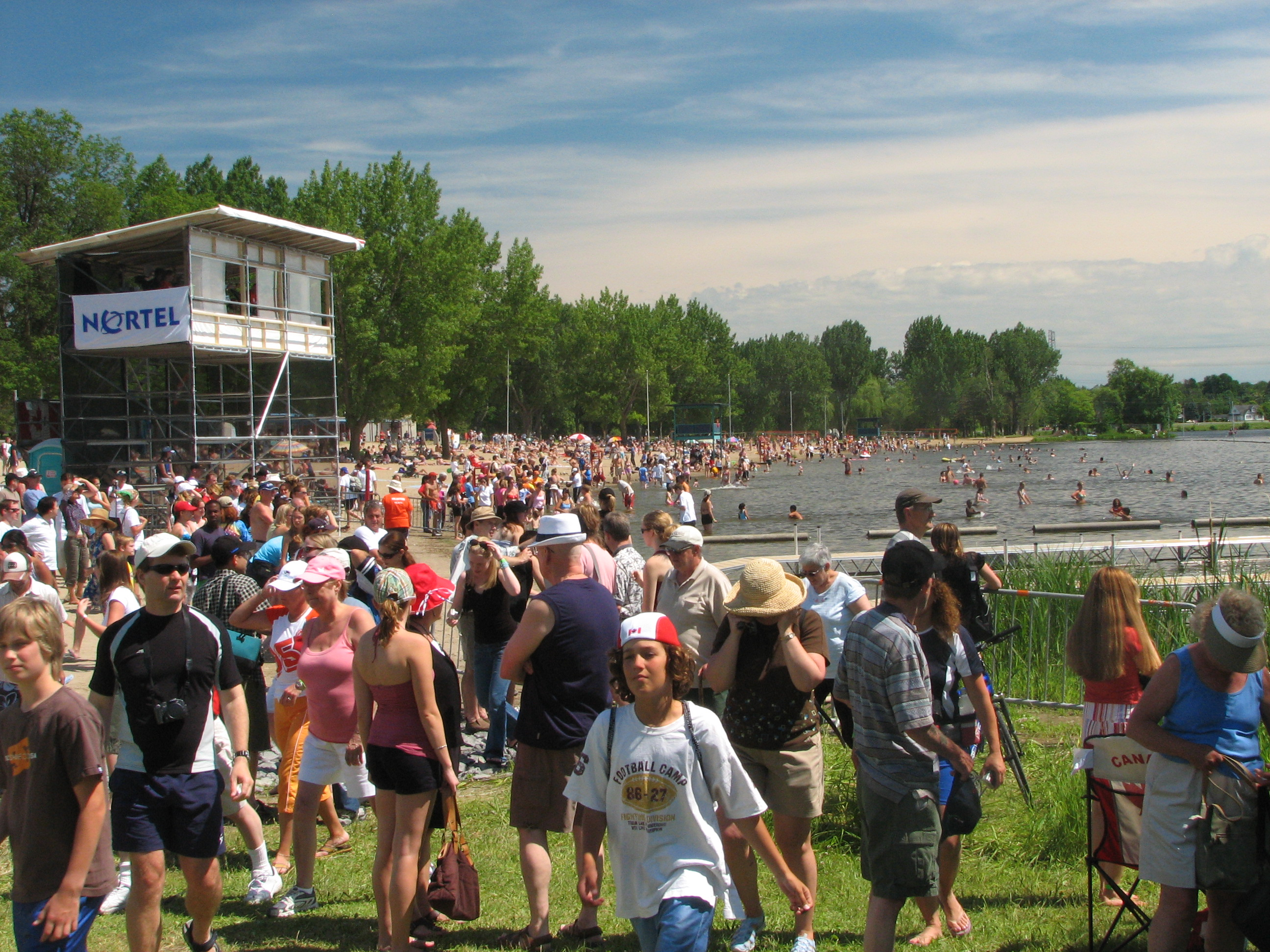

Related topics
- Festivals of Canada; festivals of Ontario; lists of festivals by city (Calgary; Edmonton; Lethbridge; Montreal; Toronto; Vancouver; Winnipeg); culture of Ottawa; tourism in Ottawa (attractions)

This is a list of festivals in Ottawa, Ontario, Canada. This list includes festivals of diverse types, such as regional festivals, commerce festivals, fairs, food festivals, arts festivals, religious festivals, folk festivals, and recurring festivals on holidays. The city hosts several large festivals each year, including Ottawa Bluesfest Canada's largest blues festival, as well as the Bell Capital Cup, one of the world's largest hockey tournaments.

== Festivals ==
- Canada Dance Festival
- Canadian Stone Carving Festival
- Canadian Tulip Festival
- Capital Hoedown
- Capital Idea!
- Capital Pride (Ottawa)
- Festival Franco-ontarien
- Latin Sparks Festival
- Lumière Festival
- Ottawa Burlesque Festival
- Ottawa Dragon Boat Race Festival
- Ottawa International Children's Festival
- Ottawa International Hockey Festival
- Ottawa International Writers Festival
- Ottawa StoryTellers
- Ottawa SuperEX
- Rideau Canal Festival
- VegOttawa Fest
- Westfest
- Winterlude
- Winter Pride

=== Cultural festivals ===
- Capital Ukrainian Festival
- Carnival of Cultures
- European Festival
- the Great India Festival
- Irish Film Festival Ottawa
- Ottawa Greek Festival
- Ottawa Lebanese Festival
- Ottawa Italian Week Festival
- Palestinian Festival Ottawa

=== Film & stage festivals ===
- Asinabka Film and Media Arts Festival
- European Union Film Festival
- Inside Out Film and Video Festival
- Irish Film Festival Ottawa
- Latin American Film Festival
- One World Film Festival
- Ottawa Canadian Film Festival
- Ottawa Fringe Festival
- Ottawa International Animation Festival
- Ottawa International Film Festival
- Youth Infringement Festival

=== Food & beverage festivals ===
- Ottawa Poutine Festival
- Ottawa Ribfest
- Ottawa Wine and Food Festival
- Winter Brewfest
- Orléans Craft Beer Festival
- Ottawa Beer Fest

=== Music festivals ===
- CityFolk Festival
- Escapade Music Festival
- Music and Beyond
- O-Town Hoedown
- Ottawa Bluesfest
- Ottawa Chamberfest
- Ottawa International Buskerfest
- Ottawa Jazz Festival

=== Pop culture festivals ===
- Ottawa Comiccon
- Ottawa Pop Expo

== Gallery ==
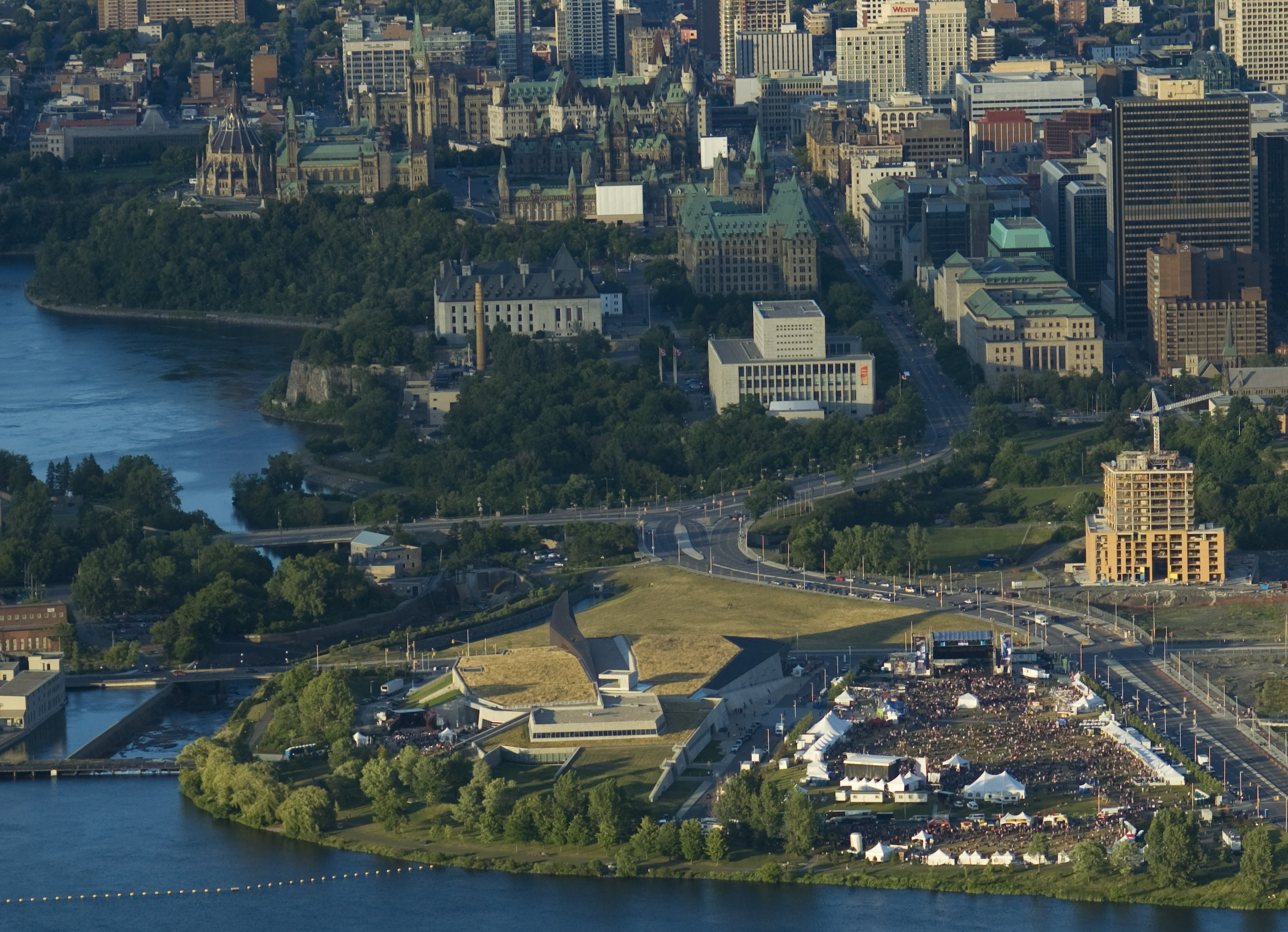
Cisco Ottawa Bluesfest 2007 in LeBreton Flats

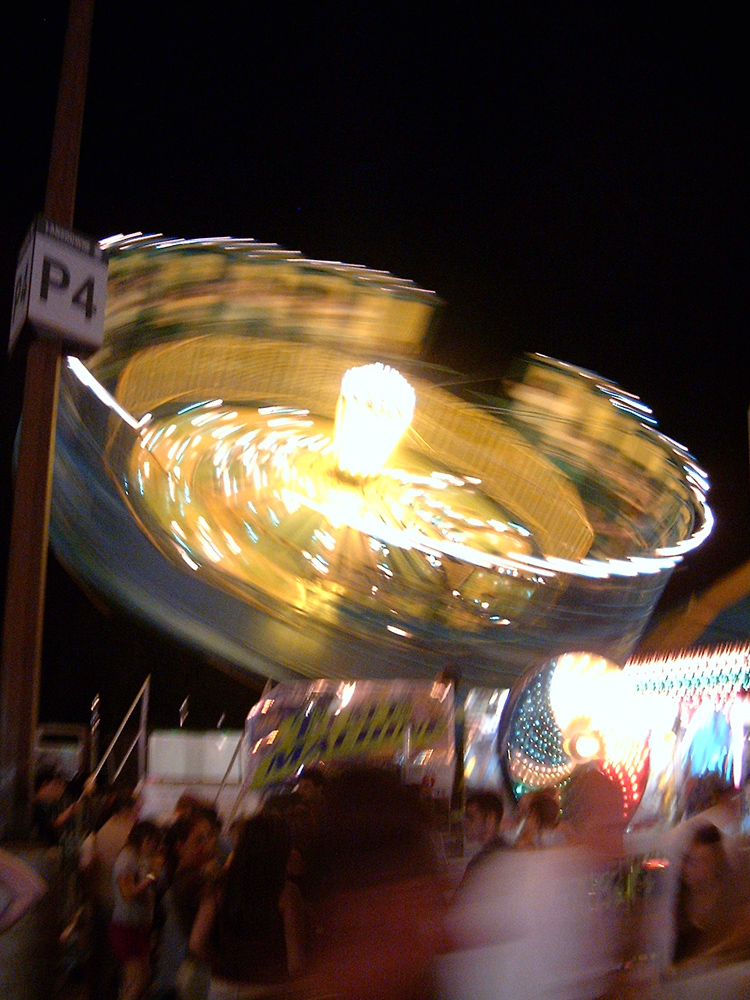
A ride at the Central Canadian Exhibition

== See also ==
- List of festivals in Ontario
- List of festivals in Canada
- List of attractions in Ottawa
