= Daniel Allen Cox =

Canadian author and screenwriter

- Born: February 3, 1976 (age 50); Montreal, Quebec, Canada
- Occupation: Writer
- Writing career
- Period: 2000s–present
- Notable works: Shuck, Krakow Melt

Daniel Allen Cox (born February 3, 1976) is a Canadian author. Cox's novels Shuck and Krakow Melt were both finalists for the Lambda Literary Award and the ReLit Award, and his memoir-in-essays I Felt the End Before It Came: Memoirs of a Queer Ex-Jehovah's Witness was a finalist for the Grand Prix du livre de Montréal.

== Life and career ==
Cox was born in Montreal, Quebec, Canada, where he was raised a Jehovah's Witness. His novella Tattoo This Madness In, about a young Jehovah's Witness who uses Smurf tattoos to rebel against his faith, was nominated for an Expozine Alternative Press Award.

Shuck, his debut novel about a New York City hustler, was a Lambda Literary Award and a ReLit Award finalist. Cox's second novel Krakow Melt was excerpted in The Advocate, nominated for the Ferro-Grumley Award, and named to the American Library Association's Over the Rainbow List. The novel formed the basis of three essays in the debut issue of The Word Hoard, academic journal of the Department of English and Writing Studies at Western University.

The author's third and fourth novels, Basement of Wolves and Mouthquake, were also published by Arsenal Pulp Press. An excerpt of Mouthquake was translated for Nova Istra literary journal as the first queer text to be published in the Chakavian dialect of Croatian, as well as the first text to introduce the personage of Antonio Barichievich, Croatian-Canadian strongman, to a Croatian literary audience. Cox read the entire novel out loud at a durational performance, the last event held at RATS9 gallery in Montreal.

Cox has appeared at Ottawa International Writers Festival, Blue Metropolis Montréal International Literary Festival, Winnipeg International Writers Festival, Victoria Festival of Authors, GritLit Festival, Westfest, the Atlanta Queer Literary Festival, and Strand Bookstore, as well as on CBC Radio One and Airelibre TV. He co-wrote the screenplay for the Bruce LaBruce film Gerontophilia, and is a former columnist for Xtra! and former president of the Quebec Writers' Federation.

His essays and short stories have been published in several anthologies and literary journals, including The Guardian, The Globe and Mail,Electric Literature, Literary Hub, Catapult, The Florida Review, The Rumpus, Fourth Genre, Maisonneuve, Open Book Toronto, and filling Station. His essay "The Glow of Electrum", published in The Malahat Review, was named Notable in The Best American Essays 2021 and was a finalist for a Canadian National Magazine Award in Personal Journalism. His essay "You Can't Blame Movers for Everything Broken," also published in The Malahat Review, was named Notable in The Best American Essays 2023 and was reprinted in Best Canadian Essays 2024. Cox was a juror for the 2021 Dayne Ogilvie Prize presented by Writers' Trust of Canada.

Cox's memoir-in-essays I Felt the End Before It Came: Memoirs of a Queer Ex-Jehovah's Witness was published in May 2023. It was a finalist for the Grand Prix du livre de Montréal, named a Publishers Weekly Best Book of 2023, and reviewed in The Washington Post.

== Bibliography ==
- —— (2006). Tattoo This Madness In. Dusty Owl Press. ISBN 9780973926644.
- —— (2008). Shuck. Arsenal Pulp Press. ISBN 9781551522463.
- —— (2010). Krakow Melt. Arsenal Pulp Press. ISBN 9781551523729.
- —— (2012). Basement of Wolves. Arsenal Pulp Press. ISBN 9781551524467.
- —— (2015). Mouthquake. Arsenal Pulp Press. ISBN 9781551526041.
- —— (2023). I Felt the End Before It Came: Memoirs of a Queer Ex-Jehovah's Witness. Penguin Random House Canada. ISBN 9780735242104.
