= DJ Lady D =

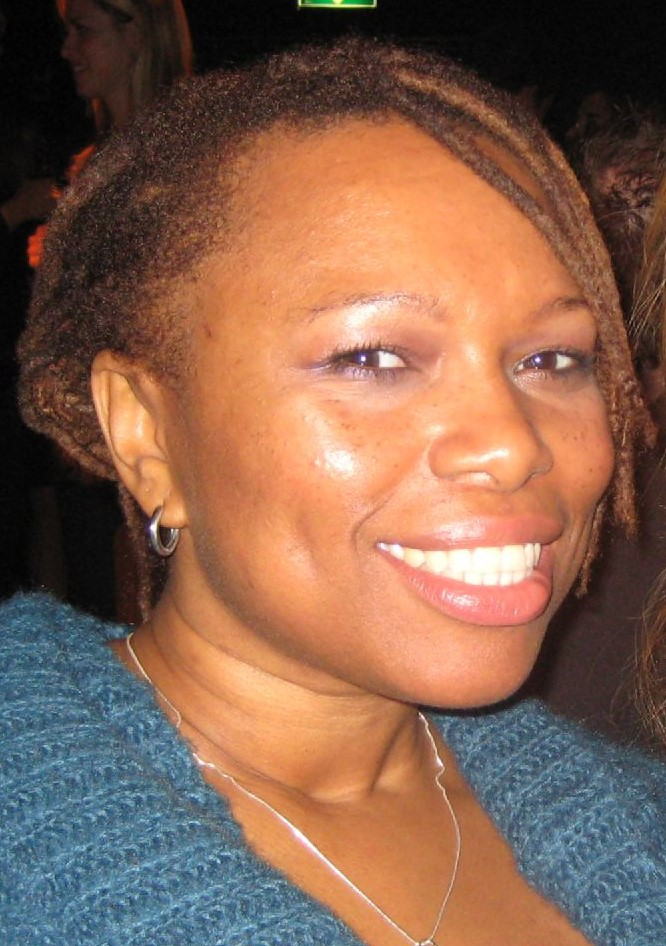
- Jackson in 2008

Background information
- Born: Darlene Jackson
- Origin: Chicago, Illinois, USA
- Years active: 1995–present
- Website: www.djladydchicago.com
- Education: Whitney M. Young Magnet High School
- Alma mater: Northwestern University (MD)

Darlene Jackson, known as DJ Lady D, is an American DJ and writer from Chicago, voted Chicago's Best House Music DJ of 2023 in the Chicago Reader annual poll . Dubbed "Chicago's house music queen" by Chicago Magazine, she is known for her house, techno and disco sets and has appeared in events such as Wanderlust, Noise Pop, Westfest, SXSW and Lollapalooza. EDM.com listed Jackson as one of the "top 10 black artists from Chicago." In 2022, BET.com cited Jackson as a pioneer of the house music movement along with Black DJs like Black Coffee, Vince Lawrence, and Gene Farris. Popsugar validates Jackson as one of "the black women who shaped house music" and Mother Jones references DJ Lady D in a think piece about Beyonce's smash single, "Break My Soul", and acknowledges Jackson, has been "pumping out house music for decades" like artists Chip E. and Black Coffee, according to the article. Jackson was recently elected in June 2023 to the Board of Governors for the Recording Academy Chicago Chapter.

== Early life ==
Jackson grew up in South Side Chicago, Illinois in Washington Heights with two brothers and three sisters. She went to Marcus Garvey Elementary School and listened to the radio when she was a child. She attended Whitney M. Young Magnet High School and studied science. She received her undergraduate degree in Biology at Millikin University in Decatur, Illinois.

== Career ==
She started professionally DJing in 1995. Her first track, "Champagne Lady", was released on Afterhours Music as was included in Afterhours Compilation Sessions Vol. 2. She then released a mix CD called Naked Kaleidoscope. She was invited to play for one of her friends, who was a promoter, and because of that, had various promoters contacting her. She opened to fellow Chicago DJ Paul Johnson in 1996. In 1997, she formed the all-female DJ collective Superjane, which also includes DJ Heather, DJ Colette, and DJ Dayhota to "prove that women DJs were more than a novelty act." In 2000, she participated with Superjane in the SuperJane USA Tour 2000 with Austrian DJ Electric Indigo.

In 2004, she started her own record label called D'lectable Music.

In 2011, she appeared at Lollapalooza and was interviewed alongside Young the Giant. She received a Master's degree from Northwestern University in 2016 and started advising students at Columbia College Chicago. On July 6, 2019, she was included in Westfest. In 2020, she became the president of the theatre group Collaboraction. In 2024, Lady D performed the half-time show for the Chicago Bulls vs Memphis Grizzlies game at the United Center. Her song, "A Deep-Felt Love" was signed to Defected Records and released on the Soulfuric Deep imprint on January 26, 2024. It went to #1 on the Deep House Charts on Traxsource.com.

== Artistry ==
=== Influences ===
Jackson has been inspired by other artists such as Lil Louis, Yoko Ono, Depeche Mode, D'Angelo, and the Cocteau Twins.
