= Theatre of Early Music =

Canadian instrumental ensemble

- Origin: Montreal, Quebec, Canada
- Genres: Baroque music
- Years active: 2001–present
- Website: www.theatreofearlymusic.com

The Theatre of Early Music is a choir and Baroque instrumental ensemble based in Montreal, and later in Toronto. It is conducted by Daniel Taylor. The group performs and records early sacred music. Among of the group's better known pieces are various settings of the Stabat Mater.

== History ==
The Theatre of Early Music was founded by Daniel Taylor in 2001.

The recording Bach Cantatas was nominated for the Classical Album of the Year Juno Award in 2003.

The group's recording Scarlatti: Stabat Mater was reviewed in the Early Music Review in 2005. It was nominated for a Juno Award in 2006.

In 2009, the group released the album The Voice of Bach.

In 2011, the Theatre of Early Music performed in New York City at Weill Recital Hall.

In 2015, the recording The Heart's Refuge was nominated for a Juno Award.

The group moved its focus to Toronto when Taylor, its conductor and founder, joined the University of Toronto faculty.

In 2018, the group performed at the Music and Beyond festival in Ottawa.
