= Leslie Armour =

Canadian philosopher and economist (1931–2014)

Leslie Armour FRSC (9 March 1931 – 1 November 2014) was a Canadian-born philosopher and writer on social economics. He was the father of the cellist and impresario Julian Armour.

== Academic career ==
Armour completed a BA at the University of British Columbia in 1952 and a PhD at the University of London in 1956. At the time of his death, he was a fellow of the Royal Society of Canada and a Research Professor of Philosophy at the Dominican University College, Ottawa, Adjunct Professor of Philosophical Theology at St. Paul University, and Emeritus Professor of Philosophy at the University of Ottawa. He taught at universities in Montana, California, and Ohio. From 2004 to 2010, he was editor of the International Journal of Social Economics. His major areas of research included metaphysics, epistemology, philosophy, the philosophical underpinnings of economics and "he is a pioneer in publishing early Canadian philosophy and has philosophical publications in metaphysics, religion, law, politics and economics". Armour has contributed significantly to the interdisciplinary school of Canadian Studies.

He authored nine books (three with co-authors), more than seventy chapters in books and a hundred articles in scholarly journals. He was a frequent speaker at conferences on economics, religious studies and French and German philosophy. There is a bibliography to 2001 and extensive commentaries on Armour's work in William Sweet's Idealism, Metaphysics, and Community.

== Inference and Persuasion ==
Armour's most recent book, Inference and Persuasion: An Introduction to Logic and Critical Reasoning (2005), was co-authored by Richard A. Feist. It is written so as to be accessible to all audiences and is concerned with the problems associated with logic, offering suggestions rather than solutions, for, as Armour states, nothing is certain. This book discusses meaning-assignment, rule-making, beliefs, and the correlation between belief and action. It pays special attention to how these are misunderstood, corrupted and blocked so that we are robbed of our freedom. The authors argue that reason and experience are both important to logic, and that logic is important because it allows for understanding and survival.

Inference is described as the beliefs and judgments that create rules. Inference and rule are tools that we use for freedom. We think for ourselves and draw our own conclusions; knowledge permits freedom to act. Yet the way inferences are drawn is subject to the influence of logicians, such as Aristotle, and their language. Aristotle's focus on class inclusion and exclusion highlights the limits of the language of logic. This idea of classification is problematic, as it ignores things not included in a class and the fact that the meaning of classes is not clear. "Trying to lay out axioms or rules in advance... will always lead to limitations" because "imposing systems on our thinking seems to bring limits into play".

Examining John Dewey's logic (Chapter Four), the notion that reason and experience are interconnected is evident. Logic is concerned with the 'human world', which is not the 'world in itself'. Thinking has a purpose; it is a problem solving tool, an attempt to make experience coherent.

The authors go through previous theories and views on logic and add interesting and thought-provoking ideas. They note the tensions between experience and logic, the biases associated with reasoning, and the importance of context. In "Logic and Morality" it is argued that our biases inform how we form our understanding of facts. How we reason about what to do is based on practicality, which is based on our values. In "Logic and Politics" we see the notion of classes, as assembled from members, as individualist, with community interests ignored. The authors suggest we must understand the world through relationships, since individuals only exist in context, such as social contexts. Logic has the tendency to either ignore social realities or create individualist societies.

Concluding their text with the limits set by the rules of logic, they state that the ultimate reason for caution in using logic is that "One should not let one's choice of logic impose restrictions on one's freedom — provided of course that one can see rational alternatives. Where that line is drawn readers must decide for themselves"

== Accomplishments ==
Armour was elected to the Royal Society of Canada in August 1998, which recognized his significant contribution to research and scholarly work.

== Publications ==
- The Rational and the Real, Martinus Nijhoff, The Hague, 1962.
- The Concept of Truth, Royal Van Gorcum, Assen, and The Humanities Press, New York, 1969.
- Logic and Reality, Royal Van Gorcum, Assen, and the Humanities Press, Atlantic Highlands, New Jersey, 1972.
- The Conceptualization of the Inner Life, (with E. T. Bartlett III) The Humanities Press, Atlantic Highlands, New Jersey, 1980.
- The Faces of Reason: Philosophy in English Canada, 1850–1950, (with Elizabeth Trott), Wilfrid Laurier University Press, Waterloo, Ontario, 1981. (Distributed in the United States by Humanities Press, Atlantic Highlands, New Jersey) Reprinted 1995.
- The Idea of Canada and the Crisis of Community, Steel Rail, Ottawa, 1981 (Distributed by Humanities Press, Atlantic Highlands, New Jersey).
- Edited, annotated and wrote introduction for, with Elizabeth Trott: John Clark Murray, The Industrial Kingdom of God, University of Ottawa Press, Ottawa, 1982.
- Being and Idea, Developments of Some Themes in Spinoza and Hegel, Georg Olms, Hildesheim, Germany, 1992.
- Infini-Rien: Pascal's Wager and the Human Paradox, Carbondale, Illinois: Southern Illinois University Press for the Journal of the History of Philosophy (Journal of the History of Philosophy Monograph Series), 1993.
- Inference & Persuasion (with Richard Feist), Halifax: Fernwood, 2006.

Armour has also published some 200 papers in learned journals and chapters in books.
