= Canadian Postal Museum =

Museum in the Canadian Museum of Civilization in Quebec

Coordinates: 45°25′47″N 75°42′32″W

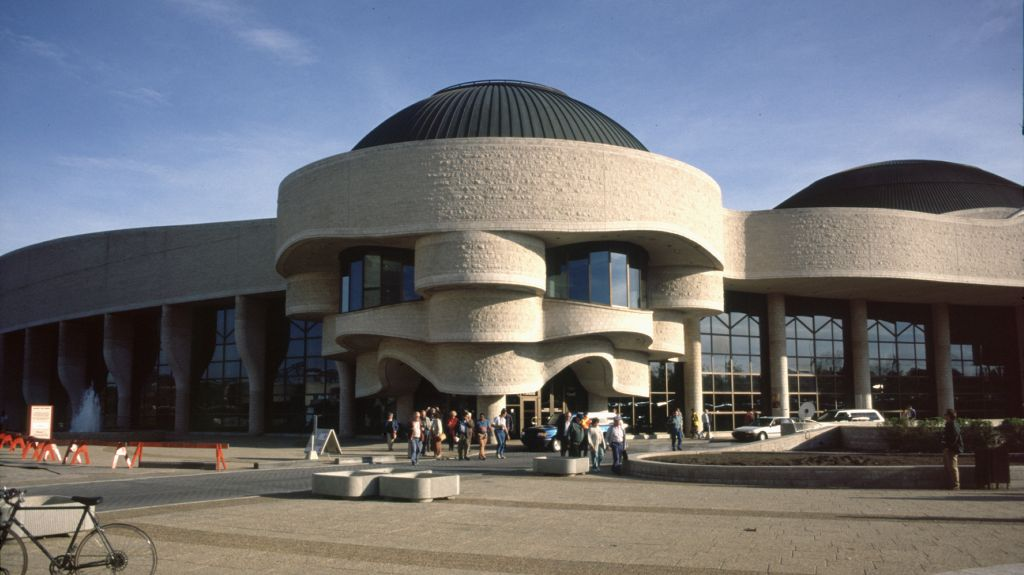
- Established: 1971
- Dissolved: 2012
- Location: Within Canadian Museum of Civilization in Gatineau, Quebec
- Type: Postal Museum
- Website: Museum Site (defunct)

Canadian Museum of History network
- Canadian Museum of History; Canadian War Museum; Virtual Museum of New France

The Canadian Postal Museum (CPM) was a museum once housed within the Canadian Museum of Civilization in Gatineau, Quebec. It was described by the Smithsonian Museum as being one of the five largest postal museums in the world, ranking second in annual attendance. The museum was not primarily about postage stamps, although it has a first-class collection that numbered in the tens of thousands. Rather, it presented the broader story of Canada's postal heritage, including the social and economic importance of postal communications throughout the country's history. It also explored international themes relating to postal communications.

== Collections ==
The museum's collections included a writing desk that belonged to Sandford Fleming, designer of Canada's first postage stamp; Canadian and foreign letter boxes and postal uniforms; mail bags and rural mail boxes; post office signs and sorting equipment. Among the museum highlights was Reflections of Canada: the National Stamp Collection, which included examples of every postage stamp ever issued in Canada. In addition to its public exhibitions, the museum had a mandate to collect, preserve and interpret material objects relating to Canada's postal heritage.

== Timeline ==
The Canadian Postal Museum was established in 1971 and opened in 1974 as the National Postal Museum. It joined the Canadian Museum of Civilization in 1988, adopted its current name in 1996, and moved into a permanent space in the Museum of Civilization in 1997.

The museum was closed in 2012 as the Canadian Museum of Civilization began to prepare to transition into the Canadian History Museum. The Postal Museum collections, now in storage, are managed by the Canadian Museum of Civilization Corporation, a federal Crown Corporation that is also responsible for the Canadian Museum of Civilization, the Canadian War Museum, the Canadian Children's Museum, and the Virtual Museum of New France. The postal collection is being broken up. According to the Canadian Museum of Civilization, "Many [artifacts] will be included in the new Canadian history gallery, to be completed in 2017. The national stamp collection, Reflections of Canada – The National Stamp Collection, will be moved to a new gallery, to open in 2014. Two traveling exhibitions are also being developed and will be shown at museums across the country. As well, A Chronology of Canadian Postal History and many other online exhibitions will remain on the Museum's website."

== Affiliations ==
The museum was affiliated with Canadian Museums Association, Canadian Heritage Information Network, and the Virtual Museum of Canada. In 2000 it became a member of the Club de Monte-Carlo de l'élite de la philatélie.

== See also ==
- Postal Museum
- Canada Post
