= CCGS Alexander Henry =

Coordinates: 44°13′28.5″N 76°28′56.5″W

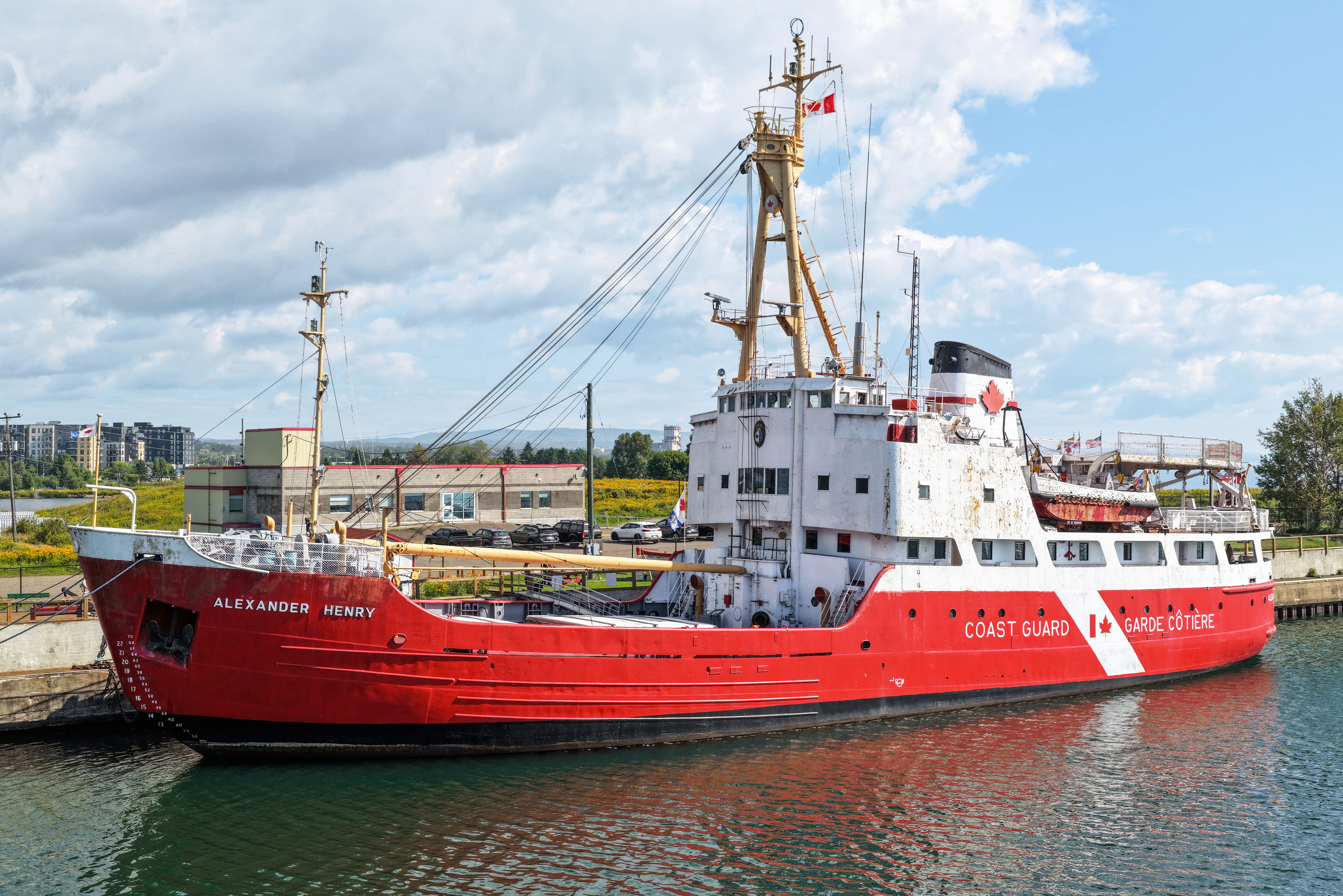
- CCGS Alexander Henry in retirement as a museum ship in Thunder Bay, Ontario

History

Canada
- Name: Alexander Henry
- Namesake: Alexander Henry
- Operator: Department of Transport Marine Service; Canadian Coast Guard
- Builder: Port Arthur Shipbuilding Co. Ltd., Port Arthur
- Cost: $2,259,750.00
- Launched: 18 July 1958
- Christened: 18 July 1958
- In service: July 1959
- Out of service: 1985
- Identification: IMO number: 5010062
- Status: Museum ship since 1986

General characteristics
- Type: Light icebreaker and supply and buoy tender
- Tonnage: 1,674 GRT
- Displacement: 2,497 long tons (2,537 t)
- Length: 64.0 m (210 ft 0 in) oa; 58.6 m (192 ft 3 in) pp
- Beam: 13.3 m (43 ft 8 in)
- Draught: 4.9 m (16.08 ft)
- Installed power: 3,550 bhp (2,650 kW)
- Propulsion: 2 × Fairbanks-Morse 10-cylinder 2-cycle diesel model 37F16
- Speed: 13 knots (24 km/h)

CCGS Alexander Henry is a former Canadian Coast Guard light icebreaker and buoy tender that served on the Great Lakes from 1959 to 1984. In 1986, the vessel was handed over to the Marine Museum of the Great Lakes in Kingston, Ontario for preservation as a museum ship. Previously, during the summer months the vessel was also operated as a bed and breakfast. In 2017, the ship was sold to the Lakehead Transportation Museum Society in Thunder Bay, Ontario. That June, the ship was relocated to the Pool 6 site on the town's harbour front, where Alexander Henry continues as a museum ship.

== Design and description ==
Alexander Henry is a light icebreaker and buoy tender that was designed to serve on the Great Lakes. The vessel displaces 2,497 long tons (2,537 t) and is measured at 1,674 gross register tons (GRT). She is 64.0 metres (210 ft 0 in) long overall and 58.6 metres (192 ft 3 in) long between perpendiculars with a beam of 13.3 metres (43 ft 8 in) and a draught of 4.9 metres (16 ft 1 in). The ship is powered by two Fairbanks-Morse 10-cylinder 2-cycle 37F16 diesel engines driving two shafts creating 3,550 brake horsepower (2,650 kW). This gives the ship a maximum speed of 13 knots (24 km/h; 15 mph). No helicopter facilities were added to the ship as they were considered unnecessary for freshwater operations.

== Operational history ==
The vessel was constructed by Port Arthur Shipbuilding Co. Ltd. at their yard in Port Arthur, Ontario and launched on 18 July 1958. The icebreaker entered service in July 1959 with the Department of Transport's Marine Service as CGS Alexander Henry using the prefix "Canadian Government Ship". Named after Alexander Henry the elder, an 18th-century British explorer and fur trader, she was transferred in 1962 to the newly created Canadian Coast Guard and given the new prefix Canadian Coast Guard Ship (CCGS).

CCGS Alexander Henry served her entire coast guard career on the Great Lakes, stationed on Lake Superior. In 1976, the vessel was used for an experiment testing the icebreaking capability of a hover platform pushed in front of the ship. Attached to the ship's bow, the hover platform worked well in certain conditions, but required too much fuel and made excess noise. The hover platform also became an impediment to the ship should the platform breakdown. The planned deployment to cargo ships was never approved and though the experiment failed, self-propelled hovercraft are now utilised for icebreaking. The vessel was docked in Kingston, Ontario by Bernard Rashotte and Alexander Henry retired from service in 1985 after CCGS Samuel Risley entered service.

=== Museum ship ===
In June 1985, Alexander Henry was turned over to the Marine Museum of the Great Lakes in Kingston, Ontario to become a museum ship. The vessel was used as floating maritime gallery and seasonal bed and breakfast by the museum.

Alexander Henry entered Kingston's drydocks in 2010 to undergo inspection for conservation issues. Following the sale of the property in early 2016 that the Marine Museum was housed in, the museum was forced to find a new location for Alexander Henry. The ship was temporarily housed by a local entrepreneur until the former Coast Guard vessel's fate could be determined. The icebreaker was moved to a wharf near Prinyer's Cove in Prince Edward County, Ontario. The city of Kingston was given three options to deal with the ship: offer to sell her to Thunder Bay, where the vessel was constructed; convert her to an artificial reef, or scrap her. Selling her was the cheapest way to dispose of the ship, as converting to an artificial reef would cost over $422,000, and scrapping would cost $326,000.

The Lakehead Transportation Museum Society purchased the vessel for $2, and on 11 April 2017, received $125,000 from the City of Thunder Bay to cover towing costs to bring the ship from Kingston to Thunder Bay. Alexander Henry departed Kingston on 20 June and arrived in Thunder Bay on 28 June. The vessel was docked temporarily at the C.N. Ore Dock until the permanent site was ready at the Pool 6 site along the city's waterfront. The museum ship opened to public tours on 18 July 2018.
