= Julian Armour =

Canadian cellist and artistic director

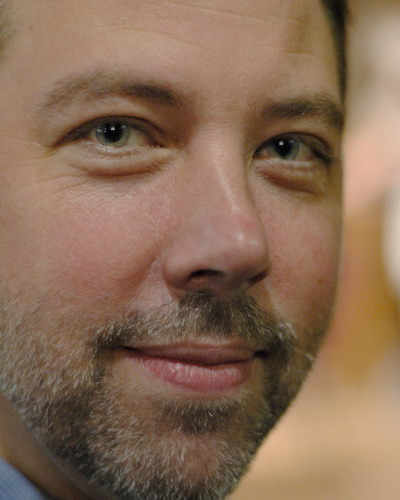
Julian Armour

Julian Armour, MSM (born 29 September 1960 in Missoula, MT) is a Canadian cellist and artistic director. Armour is married to violist Guylaine Lemaire. He is the son of the philosopher Leslie Armour.

== Early life and education ==
Shortly after his birth in Missoula, Montana, United States Armour's parents (both Canadian citizens) moved the family back to Canada. Armour majored in history, economics and English literature at the University of Ottawa. After graduation, he studied at McGill University with Walter Joachim, a Canadian cellist. He later continued to study with cellists including János Starker, Ralph Kirshbaum, Aldo Parisot and Leonard Rose.

== Career ==
Armour performs throughout Canada, the United States and Europe. His music is played on CBC Radio. As a chamber musician, he has appeared in television broadcasts on CBC, CTV, PBS, EWTN, and Vision TV. He has recorded over 30 CDs for labels including Marquis, Crystal, ATMA, CMS Classics, CentreDiscs, SRI, CanSona, Studea Musica and CBC Records.

He is the founder of the Ottawa Chamber Music Society (OCMS). Until his resignation in March 2007, he was the OCMS' Artistic and Executive Director. Under his directorship, the OCMS's main event, the Ottawa International Chamber Music Festival, grew to become the world's largest chamber music festival. From 2003 to 2009, Armour was the president of the Ottawa Festival Network.

In 2000 Armour received the Victor Tolgesy Arts Award from the Canada Council for the Arts. It recognizes those who contribute to the city's cultural enrichment. In 1999, he was awarded the Community Foundation's Investing in People Award, in recognition of his efforts to bring classical music to new audiences. For his contributions to music, Armour was named a Chevalier de l'Ordre des Arts et des Lettres in December 2002 by the Government of France. Her Excellency the Right Honourable Adrienne Clarkson, Governor General of Canada awarded Armour the Meritorious Service Medal in 2003.

In 2011 he was awarded the "Friends of Canadian Music Award" by the Canadian League of Composers and the Canadian Music Centre for his contributions to Canadian composers. He has programmed and performed more than 1000 works by 400 different Canadian composers, including over 200 premieres. In addition to organizing full-concert tributes for more than 25 Canadian composers, Mr. Armour programmed a seven-concert festival of music specifically by women composers, as well as a series focused on emerging composers, entitled "30 under 30."

He is currently the Artistic Director of the Chamber Players of Canada, Artistic and Executive Director of Music and Beyond, and Principal Cellist of the chamber orchestra Thirteen Strings. For two years Armour taught cello masterclasses at the Orford Music. He regularly teaches at the University of Ottawa, offering courses in both music performance and arts administration. He was the Chamber Music Programmer for Galaxie between 2007 and 2011.

In 2010 Armour became Artistic and Executive Director of the festival, Music and Beyond. The "second great festival" Armour has founded, Music and Beyond presents classical music in all its forms: orchestras, choirs, bands, baroque groups and small ensembles. In special concerts it features performances that embrace music's relationships with dance, poetry, food, wine, science and visual art.
