= Bell Sensplex =

Four-pad ice facility in the city of Ottawa, Ontario, Canada

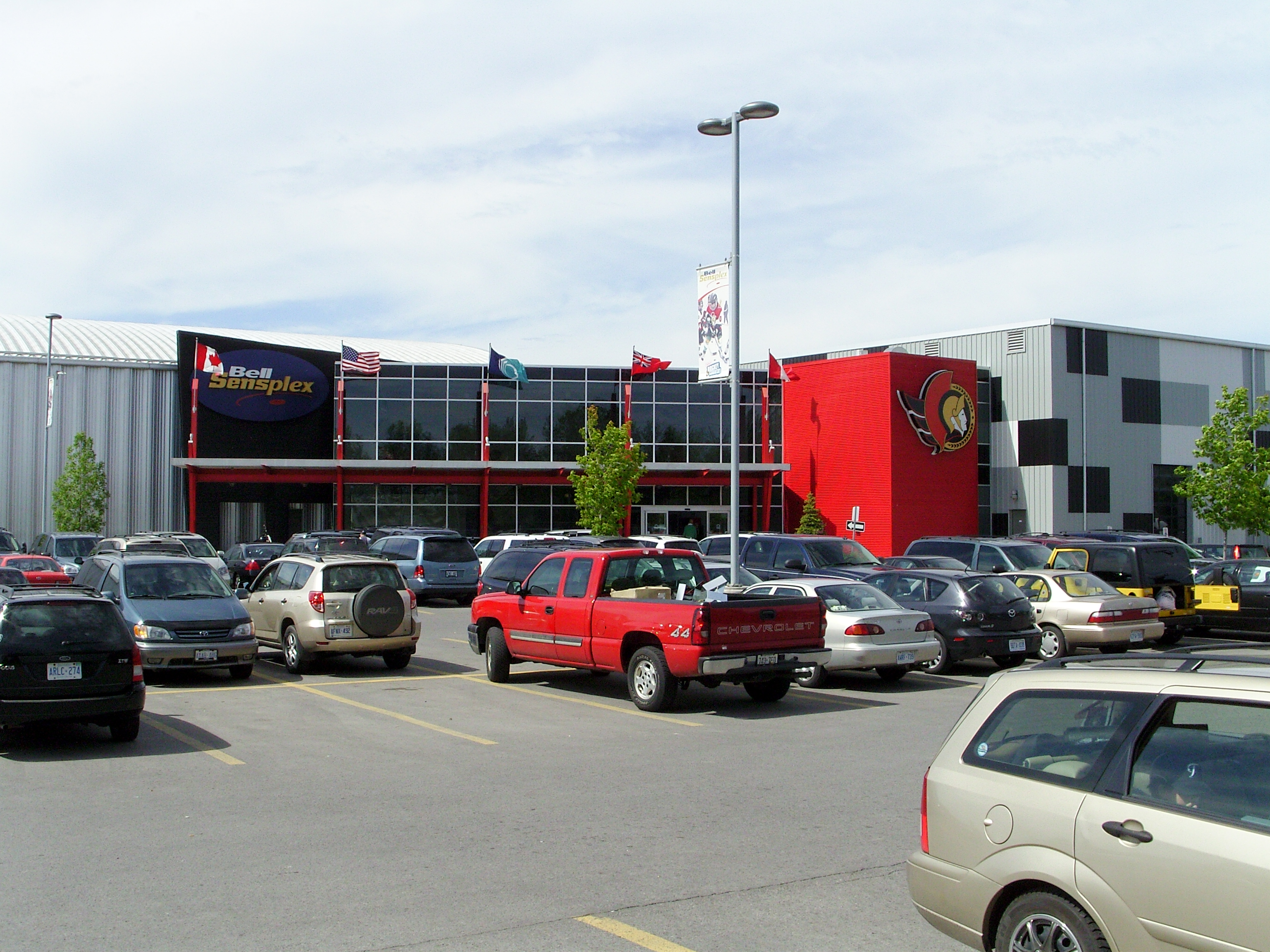
- Location: 1565 Maple Grove Road; Ottawa, Ontario; K2V 1A3
- Coordinates: 45.297442°N 75.909094°W
- Opened: December 12, 2004

The Bell Sensplex is a four-pad ice facility, located in Ottawa, Ontario, Canada. It is the primary practice facility of the Ottawa Senators NHL team and Ottawa Black Bears of the NLL. In a partnership with the city of Ottawa, it is also used for minor hockey and hosts the annual Bell Capital Cup ice hockey tournament. The Sensplex is located at 1565 Maple Grove Road in the former city of Kanata. It was also the home arena for the Ottawa Lady Senators of the Canadian Women's Hockey League and is the partial home arena of the Kanata Kings of the National Capital Junior Hockey League.

== History ==
The Senators, in a partnership with the city of Ottawa, built the Bell Sensplex, for community and team use at a cost of CA$25.6 million. The facility contains three NHL-sized ice rinks, one Olympic-size ice rink and an indoor fieldhouse in its 180,000-square-foot (17,000 m^{2}) building. The City of Ottawa provided $1.4 million of the cost to facilitate the construction. The Sensplex ultimately used only $800,000 of the City's funds. The Sensplex opened in December 2004.

== Usage ==
It is used for Senators and Black Bears team practices, minor hockey and short track speed skating. The City of Ottawa buys 2,400 hours of ice time for public use annually. The facility is the main arena for the annual Bell Capital Cup, open to Atom (9–11) and Pee-Wee (11–13) age group teams, held between Christmas Day and New Year's. The tournament attracts over 500 teams annually and bills itself as "the world's largest hockey tournament."
