= Latin Sparks Festival =

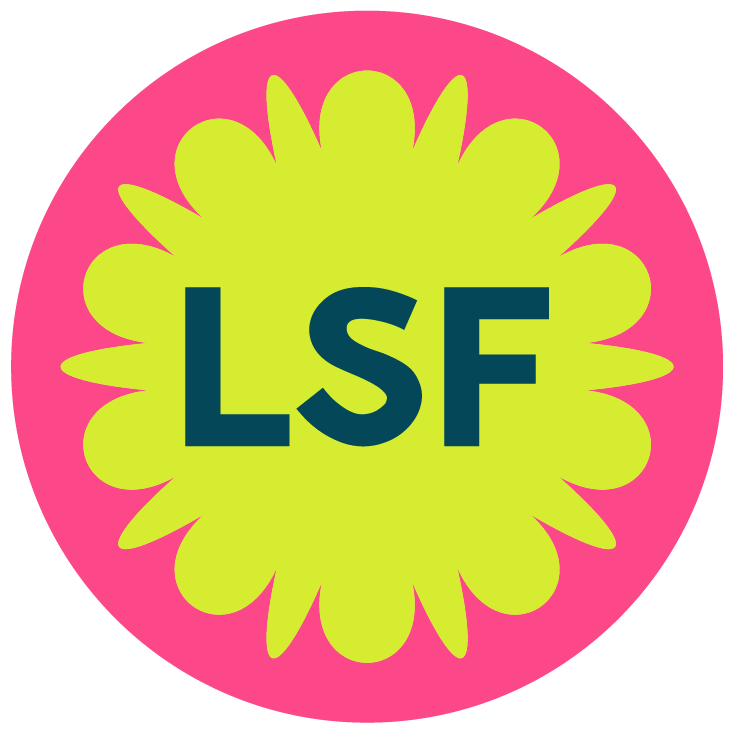
- Latin Sparks Festival icon
- Genre: Latin dance
- Locations: Ottawa, Ontario & Toronto, Ontario, Canada
- Years active: 2012–2019, 2021–
- Website: http://latinsparks.ca/

Latin Sparks Festival is Canada’s largest Latin dance party that occurs annually in Ottawa, Ontario. In 2023, over 5,000 people attended the festival in each city for one night of dancing. This years 2025 Festival is taking place at LeBreton Flats on September 6th and is expected to exceed 5000 attendees.

Latin Sparks Festival is a one-night event that brings the fire and flavour of Latin America to Canada. The annual festival features DJs, Live bands, dance performances, a variety of dance lessons, outdoor bars, authentic Latin street food and a giant outdoor party in the open-air.

== History ==
Latin Sparks made its debut in 2012 as a weekly, summer event at a patio restaurant. The event was organized by two friends. Typically, only 40 people attended.

=== 2013 ===
The festival took place on a fenced-off portion of Sparks Street, attracting approximately 1,500 guests per event. The festival consisted of 3 events held during the summer.

=== 2014 ===
During this year, the festival consisted of 5 events and attracted 4,000 guests. The festival was held on Sparks Street and covered one block.

=== 2015 ===
For the first time, the festival was a one day event that featured 2 live bands - a Cuban orchestra playing salsa and a Brazilian 25-piece Batucada playing a mix of percussions and horns. This event attracted approximately 6,000 attendees and covered 2 blocks of Sparks Street.

=== 2016 ===
Due to increased popularity, the festival moved to Albert Island for one night of Latin dancing in the open air. Albert Island is directly behind the Canadian War Museum and beside Lebreton Flats. The new venue is accessible from Booth Street and overlooks the Ottawa River. Latin Sparks 2016 attracted an estimated 3,000 attendees.

=== 2017 ===
Latin Sparks Festival was held on Albert Island again. As Canadians of Latin American descent make up one of the largest non-European ethnic groups in the country, this festival demonstrated the vibrancy and diversity of their culture in the Canada's 150th anniversary edition.

=== 2018 ===
Latin Sparks Festival expanded to Toronto and took place on Saturday, August 18. For a first time event in Toronto, the festival attracted 3,500 attendees. The Ottawa Festival still took place in Albert Island on Saturday, June 9 and attracted 4,500 attendees. Both Festivals were sold out.

=== 2019 ===
The 4-day festival will occur in Ottawa from Thursday, 30 May to Sunday, 2 June. The Main Event: Block Party on Albert Island will start at 6PM with a performance from Yani Borell accompanied by a live Salsa band. The Block Party will go on until at 2AM. Latin Sparks Festival in Toronto will occur from Thursday, 15 August to Sunday, 18 August and follow a similar schedule to the Ottawa Festival. The festival schedule consists of a Social Dance, Boat Party, Dance Bootcamp, Main Event and Hangover Brunch.

=== 2021 ===
With 2020 being cancelled and the festival going on hiatus, it returned in 2021.

=== 2022 ===
The Toronto festival expanded to a new venue - Ontario Place. The August festival featured a 15-piece Samba Fusion performance, multiple stages and DJs, the 10-piece salsa band, Salseros With Attitude (SWA) and a variety of food and drink vendors. The Ottawa Festival took place at LeBreton Flats in September.

=== 2023 ===
The Toronto festival moved to The Bentway, the festival's biggest Toronto outdoor venue so far. The Ottawa Festival returned to LeBreton Flats in September to celebrate its 10th anniversary in the city. The milestone year attracted over 5,000 attendees.

=== 2024 ===
Latin Sparks Festival took place on September 7, 2024 at LeBreton Flats Park. In addition to the fan favourite performances, signature cocktails and food trucks, dance classes and multiple entertainment stages, a new element was introduced: a Latin Dance Battle where dancers could participate for a cash prize. The event was open to all ages, children aged 12 years and younger were welcomed to attend for free and did not require a ticket.

=== 2025 ===
Latin Sparks Festival 2025 was held September 6 at LeBreton Flats in Ottawa. The festival featured the return of Dance Battle on the main stage. The lineup included 6 DJ's, a live Salsa band, dance performances, signature cocktails, food trucks and interactive exhibits including a Latin Sparks dance studio within the festival, offering dance classes in different genres and levels.

The festival continues to remain family-friendly and open to all ages, with children 12 and under admitted for free without requiring a ticket. Latin Sparks celebrates Latin culture through music, dance, and community engagement.

== Sponsors ==
The festival has been supported by private companies and various government bodies such as: the Ministry of Tourism, Culture and Sport, the City of Ottawa, the Toronto Arts Council, the Ontario Arts Council, the Ontario Cultural Arts Fund, the Canada Council for the Arts, Marriott Hotel, Hot 89.9 FM, Labatt Brewery Company, Modelo Especial, Cellection and various local Latin American restaurants.

== See also ==
- Latin American Culture
- Latin dance
- List of festivals in Ottawa
