= Wheelhouse Maritime Museum =

Coordinates: 45.4331°N 75.6918°W

- Established: 1965-1976
- Location: Ottawa, Ontario, Canada
- Type: maritime museum
- Director: Andre E. Lamirande
- President: John Fleming
- Curators: Andre E. Lamirande & Jean Trudel

The Wheelhouse Maritime Museum (WMM) was a maritime museum in Ottawa, Ontario, Canada. It opened officially on Monday, February 1, 1965, by the Underwater Society of Ottawa. (See also https://sites.google.com/view/underwater-society-of-ottawa/home/uso-main ). The Wheelhouse Maritime Museum was open to the public on Sunday afternoons from 1 to 5 p.m., and on Tuesdays and Thursdays evenings between 7 and 9 p.m. From February 1, 1965, until it closed in 1976, the museum was housed in the top-storey of 218 Cumberland Street in Ottawa.

== History ==
In February 1963, the Underwater Society of Ottawa began searching for shipwrecks in the National Capital Area for the National Capital Commission as a Canadian Centennial project.

At the time, Underwater Society of Ottawa and National Capital Commission considered devoting a section of the Bytown Museum to Ottawa River navigation. Andre Lamirande served as dive co-ordinator of a team of 18 divers.

The Wheelhouse Maritime Museum at 222 Cumberland Street, Ottawa was the Ottawa Underwater Society's contribution to Canadian Centennial. The collection of the Underwater Society of Ottawa, which had been in operation since February 1964, formed the maritime museum. The museum, which was financed by society dues, was open without charge to the public from February 1, 1965 – 1976.

Andre Lamirande served as the Wheelhouse Maritime Museum's director; he and Jean Trudel served as the curators of the Wheelhouse Maritime Museum. Andre Lamirande was the president-founder of the Underwater Society of Ottawa along with James Miller, Richard Desjardins and five others.

The Wheelhouse Maritime Museum objectives were:

- to collect, conserve and display artefacts related to marine history in Eastern Ontario and Western Quebec waters, shipping and shipbuilding,
- to construct an exhibition area for special exhibitions,
- to encourage public participation in events and activities,
- to develop a marine resource centre of archival material, books, publications, ephemera and items,
- to permit research activity related to marine history by the public, students, researchers and historians, and
- to develop educational programmes.

A Board of Advisors was formed comprising professional historians and archaeologists.

== Underwater Society of Ottawa ==
The Underwater Society of Ottawa discovered and catalogued 197 shipwrecks in Eastern Ontario and Western Quebec waters from 1964 to 1976. Although the society concentrated on paddle-wheeler and schooners that went down between 1809 and 1921, other ships were found. A man-o-war, for example, which was burned by the British during the War of 1812 was discovered in Shanks Harbor in the United States. Artifacts from the wreck of the "Atlantic", a 19th-century liner which sunk off the Marshead, Nova Scotia coast in April 1873 included a tile from the ship's staircase and a heavy "dead eye", used to secure rigging for the ship's mast.

The Underwater Society kept several volumes containing statistics, reports, diagrams, photographs and other pertinent information on the shipwrecks. The wrecks were discovered in the St. Lawrence River from Lake St. Francis to Kingston, Ontario, the Rideau Canal and the Ottawa River from Montreal, Quebec to Lake Timiskaming as well as two dozen inland tributaries and lakes.

The artifacts included "old bottles with labels such as Old Power Scotch Whisky and Ushers Green Stripe, bottles, dinner plates with boats' names on them, a 39-inch telescope, a host of small clay pipes, a shoe with the area around the big toe inexplicably cut out, one-penny gold coins issued by Mayors Store in Ottawa and a bottle labelled, 'For teeth and breath'." Artifacts salvaged from the S.S. Rothesay in the St Lawrence River included opaque china, spitoon, ceramic jug and an iron fry pan.

All findings were carefully cleaned and preserved. "Nothing is ever cut or torn from a wreck until we first make an accurate sketch of the vessel," explained Mr. Lamirande, "once it has been identified, it is carefully cleaned with chemicals or a wire brush. When rust and corrosion are removed it is coated with a plastic-like substance which can later be dissolved to permit further examination."

At the end of each diving season a list of findings was sent to the proper authorities. Once the Wheelhouse Maritime Museum was fully recognized 1965–1976, it was allowed to retain all findings. See also site https://sites.google.com/view/underwater-society-of-ottawa/home/uso-main

== Collection ==
At the Wheelhouse Maritime Museum, artifacts were wired to pegboards with brief sketches of their history taped beneath. On display were chains, valves, gauges wedges, axe heads, hinges, propellers, steering wheels, and more. Items retrieved from wrecks in the Ottawa River, included china, bottles, and a pressure toilet made in 1859. Other exhibits retrieved from wrecks in the St Lawrence River included a pulley from the schooner "Marion", which capsized in 1869.

One of the larger items in the museum was the oak hull of the Lady Colborne, constructed on Lake Deschenes in 1832, which burned and sank 1845 in Britannia Bay. The Wheelhouse Museum also has pieces of ribbing from the French brig l'Outaouais, which was sunk off Carleton Island by the British in the 1760s.

== Affiliations ==
The museum was affiliated with: Canadian Museums Association, the Bytown Museum, and the Canadian Museum of Science and Technology and the Santa Maria Society. An underwater diving park was opened in Ottawa in August 1982 by Transport Minister Jean-Luke Pepin. Although opened only to divers and historical researchers, the Santa Monica Society hoped to open it to the public in the future. In 1982, Frank Martin, an official with the Santa Maria Society, moved the Bruce, a 19th-century steamer, to a permanent underwater grave near the Ottawa Rowing Club below Sussex Drive. Among the seven vessels planned for the park were the William King, Ivy, Otter, Resolute, Maggie Bell, Mansfield and the Bruce.

== Legacy ==
The funding and accommodation did not meet the Ottawa Underwater Society's exhibit needs, and new accommodation was sought to store the extensive collection and display the exhibits. "Our greatest handicap is lack of outside financial assistance," said Mr. Lamirande. "Most of our members are in the average salary level and it's getting more and more difficult to finance operations."

The Wheelhouse Maritime Museum closed to the public in 1976 due to lack of funding and the 14-ton collection was transferred to the Canadian Museum of Science and Technology 1976–1990.

The Wheelhouse Maritime Museum continued to be involved in building scale models of the ships and published 'A Foregone Fleet:A Pictorial History of Steam-Driven Paddleboats on the Ottawa River' in 1982. On June 12, 1983, the Wheelhouse Maritime Museum provided a Retrospective on commercial navigation in the Ottawa Valley at the Billings Estate Museum.

By 1990, a decision was made to move the collection from the Museum of Science and Technology in Ottawa to the Marine Museum of the Great Lakes in Kingston. The Ottawa Chapter of Save Ontario Shipwrecks documented and photographed several hundred artifacts, which were described as deteriorating in the Canadian Museum of Science and Technology warehouses in Ottawa and then had them properly wrapped and stored prior to their shipment to the Marine Museum of the Great Lakes 1990–present.

== Bibliography ==
- Andre Lamirande and Gilles Seguin "A Foregone Fleet:A Pictorial History of Steam-Driven Paddleboats on the Ottawa River" Wheelhouse Maritime Museum (Ottawa, Ont.), Highway Book Shop, Cobalt, Ontario, 1982 ISBN 978-0-88954-236-5

== See also ==
- List of shipwrecks in the Great Lakes
- List of shipwrecks of Canada
