= Bell Capital Cup =

Canadian Hockey Tournament

The Bell Capital Cup, formerly the Bell Canada Cup is an annual ice hockey tournament staged in Ottawa, Ontario between Christmas and New Years. It is open to youth teams aged 9–13 from all over the world. The tournament attracts as many as 500 teams annually, and in 2007 was named by Guinness World Records as "the world's largest hockey tournament" (a record since broken). Proceeds from the tournament help to fund local minor hockey programs in the Ottawa area.

== Format ==
The Bell Capital Cup offers up to twenty-one divisions for boys and girls in U10 - U 13 (9 - 12 years old). Nineteen divisions feature boys teams in AAA, AA, A, B and House league divisions (classified as A, B and C) and two atom and peewee girls divisions (AA). The tournament provides each team with a 4-game minimum for AA & A divisions, 3-game minimum for all House league divisions, while teams in the AAA divisions receive a 5-game minimum. The tournament features a round-robin format, with the winner of each group advancing to the playoff round. The finals are held at Canadian Tire Centre. The games are played in 20+ venues and 35 rinks, including the Bell Sensplex, the Richcraft Sensplex, the Kanata Rec Centre, the Nepean Sportsplex, the Ray Friel Centre, the Orleans Recreation Centre, the Minto Skating Club, and the Jim Durrell Recreation Centre.

Over the years, many top teams have travelled from all over the world to participate. These teams include: Skylands Kings (two-time champions), Los Angeles Junior Kings, Detroit Belle Tire, South Florida Golden Wolves, HK Slavia Jr (Ljubljana, Slovenia), Moscow Dynamo, Jokerit Helsinki, German Eagles, Beijing Imperial Guard, Iqaluit Blizzards, Korea Eagles, Chunichi Jr Club (Nagoya, Japan), HC Vitkovice, Budapest Stars, Torino, Italy and Nice, France, and in 2013, the Hong Kong Ice Scrapers participated for the first time. Hundreds of the teams participating come from local associations throughout Ottawa and Eastern Ontario.

== Alumni ==
Many future NHL stars have played in this tournament, as well as others who have progressed to professional, NCAA, USports, Major Junior, Junior A or Junior B playing careers.

Notable alumni include:

- Connor McDavid
- P.K. Subban
- John Tavares
- Travis Konecny
- Calvin de Haan
- Erik Gudbranson
- Cody Ceci
- Johnny Gaudreau
- Mitch Marner
- Mark Scheifele

== See also ==
- List of festivals in Ottawa
