= Capital Hoedown =

Music festival in Ottawa, Ontario, Canada

Coordinates: 45°25′00″N 75°43′00″W

Capital Hoedown was a Canadian outdoor country music festival that took place in August in Ottawa, Ontario. Founded in 2010 by Denis Benoit, the three-day annual festival was one of the largest in North America; however, it was cancelled after only two years.

== 2010 Festival ==
The first Capital Hoedown festival was held August 5–7, 2010, at the Rideau Carleton Raceway.

Performers included Emerson Drive, Lorrie Morgan, Alan Jackson, Tara Oram, Jo Dee Messina, Dwight Yoakam and Vince Gill.

== 2011 Festival ==
The second Capital Hoedown festival was held August 11–13, 2011, at LeBreton Flats.

Performers included Tara Oram, Doc Walker, Kenny Chesney, Jason Blaine, Billy Currington, Miranda Lambert, Carrie Underwood, The Keats, Justin Moore, Easton Corbin, Sara Evans and Rascal Flatts.

== 2012 Festival ==
=== Timeline ===
The third Capital Hoedown festival was initially scheduled to take place August 10–12, 2012, at Walter Baker Park in Kanata. However, in May 2012 the City of Ottawa revoked permission to use the site after festival organizers failed to pay the $150,000 owed to the city. Following this development, several scheduled artists announced that they would no longer be performing at the festival, including Reba McEntire, Terri Clark and Sheryl Crow.

In June 2012, Capital Hoedown organizers reported the festival would take place at the Numech Ranch in Stittsville, with an updated lineup. However, the City denied the festival's request for a permit for this location. Taylor Swift, who was projected to headline the festival, also removed the dates from her touring schedule.

On July 9, 2012, organizers officially announced the cancellation of the iteration of Capital Hoedown, citing a number of factors including "higher than expected costs from the city, upfront production expenditures, and lower than anticipated ticket sales" as well as negative media coverage and difficulty securing a venue as factors in the decision.

Artists scheduled to perform at the event included Taylor Swift, Brad Paisley, Reba McEntire, Sheryl Crow, The Band Perry, Ronnie Dunn, Terri Clark, Gord Bamford, Tara Oram, Dean Brody, Marshall Dane, Chad Brownlee and High Valley.

Following the cancellation, organizers continued to indicate the festival would return in future years. In December 2012, founder Denis Benoit ensured the festival would take place the following summer. In August of 2014, he again declared his commitment to reviving the festival in 2015 or 2016. None of these plans came to fruition.

=== Legal action ===
In February 2013, the ticketing company responsible for the festival, Fire USA Inc., filed a lawsuit against Taylor Swift for alleged breach of contract, claiming that the singer accepted payment for a performance but never fulfilled her obligations after cancelling her appearance.

On February 26, 2014, Capital Hoedown founder, president and CEO Denis Benoit filed a $250,000 defamation lawsuit against Ottawa musician Greg Harris, also known as Lefty McRighty. The suit alleged that Benoit's reputation was negatively impacted by a blog post Harris wrote about Benoit's management of the cancelled festival.

On March 7, 2014, Benoit, filed a $250,000 defamation lawsuit against promoter Jeff Brunet for allegedly slandering him in an interview with the Cornwall Standard-Freeholder in June 2012.

In August 2014, Benoit revealed he had taken legal action against former partner Shane Merali for alleged breach of contract, seeking $350,000 in damages. The lawsuit claimed that Benoit and Merali had a verbal agreement in May 2012 to invest $375,000 into the festival, but Merali later backed out of his commitment.

In November 2014, a U.S. judge ordered Salima Rattansi and her company, Fire USA Inc., to pay US$2.6 million in damages to EVO Merchant Services, the company that refunded ticket holders after the cancelled festival.

== Controversy ==
In May 2010, Capital Hoedown organizers were contacted by owners of The O-Town Hoedown, an Ottawa country music festival established in 2007. O-Town Hoedown took issue with the similarity of the name "Capital Hoedown" to that of their own festival, and requested a name change. Capital Hoedown refused the request.

== See also ==
- List of country music festivals
- List of festivals in Canada
- Music of Canada
