= Ottawa International Hockey Festival =

The Ottawa International Hockey Festival is an annual championship held in early January. This tournament features more than 400 teams from Canada, the US, Europe, and Asia competing for the Bell Canada Cup.

The eighth annual tournament, which concluded on January 1, 2007 set a Guinness World Record for the largest ice hockey tournament. 510 teams took part in the tournament.

== Number of Teams by Year ==
- 2000 – 92 (one from USA.)
- 2001 – 182 (four from USA.)
- 2002 – 208 (ten from USA.)
- 2003 – 340 (58 USA, seven European)
- 2004 – 397 (91 USA, five European)
- 2005 – 407 (93 USA, six European)
- 2006 – 419 (more than 90 from USA, three from China.)
- 2007 – 510
