= Ottawa Bluesfest =

Annual music festival in Ottawa, Ontario

Coordinates: 45°25′00″N 75°43′00″W

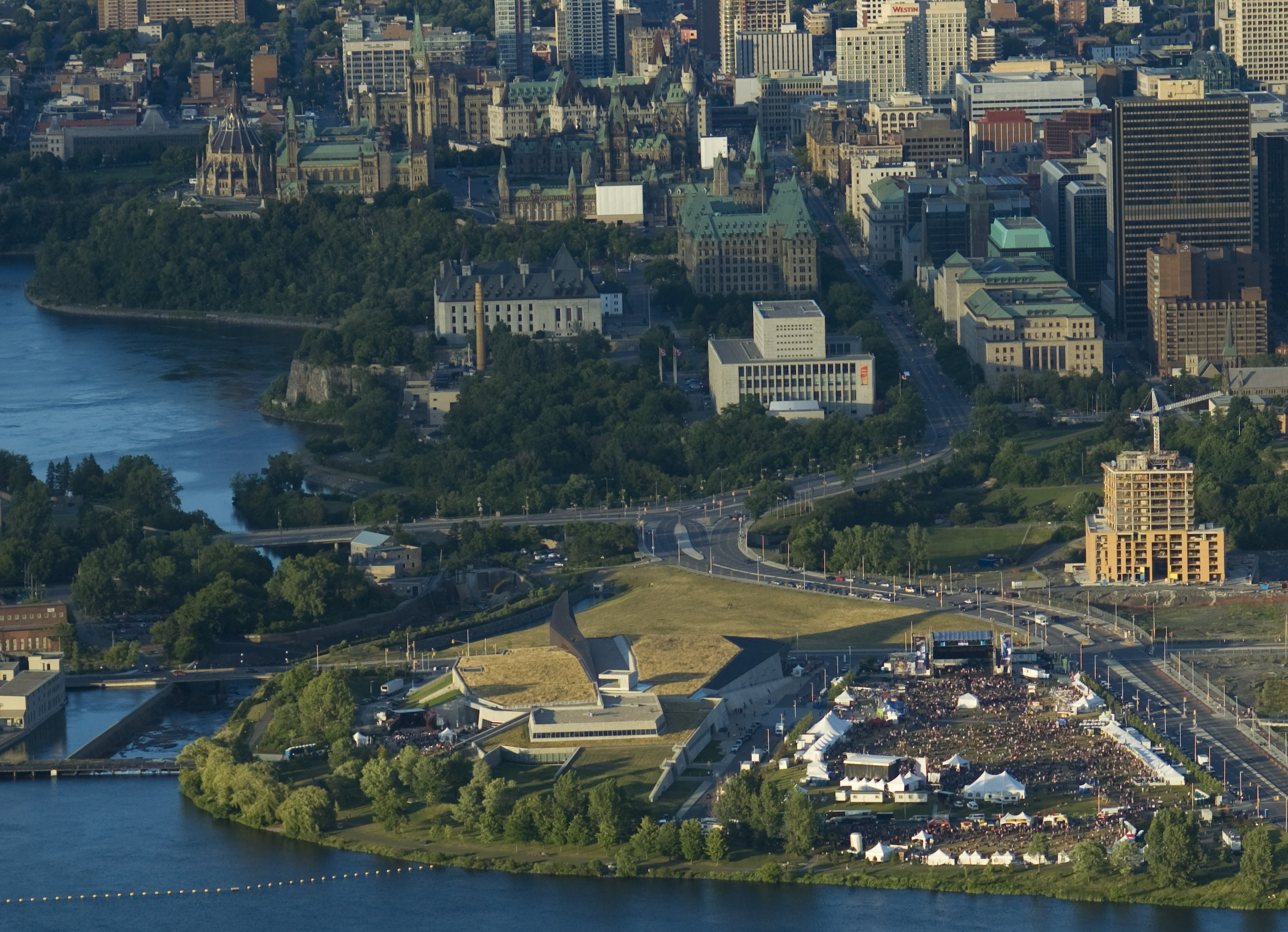
- Aerial view of the 2007 Bluesfest
- Genre: Blues, country, electronic dance music, folk, hip-hop, jazz, latin, pop, r&b, rock
- Dates: July 9–19 (2026)
- Locations: LeBreton Flats, Ottawa, Ontario, Canada
- Years active: 1994–present
- Attendance: 290,000 (2026, 9 days total)
- Capacity: 40,000 (all stages combined)

The Ottawa Bluesfest is an annual outdoor music festival that is held every July on LeBreton Flats in Ottawa, Ontario, Canada. While the festival's lineup historically focused on blues music at its inception, it has increasingly showcased other music genres such as country, EDM, hip-hop, jazz, pop, and rock in its recent years. The Bluesfest is the largest music festival in Ottawa.

Since its inception, the festival has been managed by executive and artistic director Mark Monahan. The organization also manages the CityFolk Festival and the Ontario Festival of Small Halls.

In 2002, the Ottawa Bluesfest won the Best Event Award from the Ottawa Tourism and Convention Authority and in 2003 the organization received the Keeping the Blues Alive (KBA) award for arts education from the Memphis Blues Foundation. Mark Monahan is a past recipient of the Toronto Blues Society's Blues with a Feeling award. In December 2011, Bluesfest reached a five-year sponsorship deal with the RBC Royal Bank to ensure its financial stability. Henceforth, the event will be known as the RBC Bluesfest.

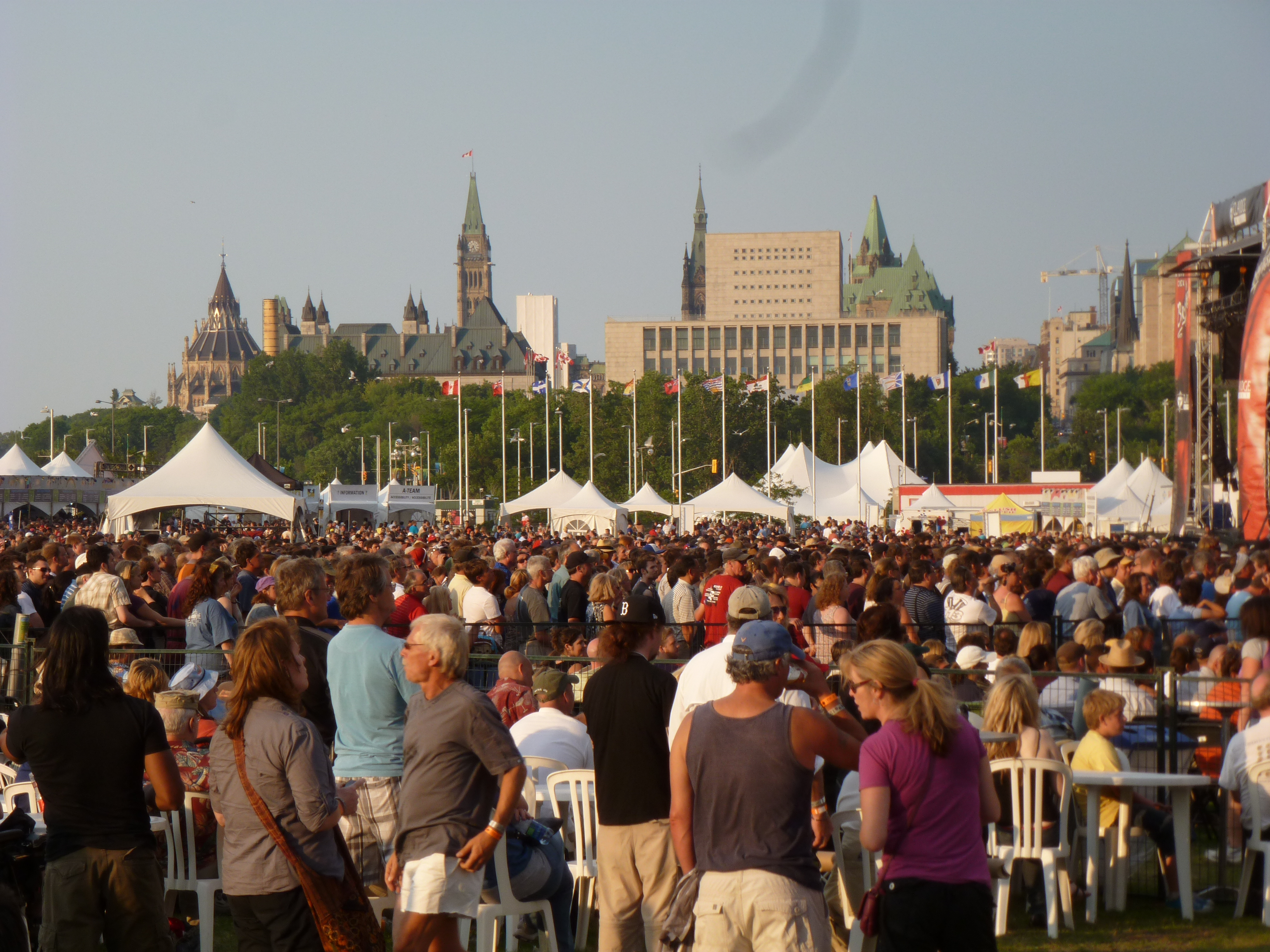
2011 edition

== History ==
The festival was first held in 1994 at Majors Hill Park as a blues festival, with the performance of Clarence Clemons, attracting 5,000 spectators. The following year the festival attracted larger crowds with entertainers like John Hiatt and Buddy Guy. In 1996, 25,000 people attended the 3-day festival to see Robert Cray, Los Lobos and others. It was then that the Mitel corporation became the first major sponsor of the event.

In 1997, the festival was moved to Confederation Park to provide more space for the increasing number of fans to see musicians such as Dr. John and Little Feat.

In 1998, over 80,000 people attended the festival over four days, which coincided with Canada Day. Bell Mobility and CIBC Wood Gundy joined the list of sponsors. In 1999, the festival was moved to LeBreton Flats. The Bluesfest became a registered charitable organization, attracting 95,000 people over five days. The Royal Canadian Mint became a sponsor. Cisco Systems became the Bluesfest Title Sponsor in 2001, while the Ottawa Citizen and the National Post became Presenting Sponsors.

In 2002, Cisco Ottawa Bluesfest moved to Festival Plaza in downtown Ottawa. The festival showcased the talents of Blue Rodeo among many others, and smashed the previous year’s record-breaking attendance of 140,000 by attracting 200,000 music fans in 10 days.

In 2003, the festival expanded to eight stages to celebrate its tenth anniversary with 220,000 people in attendance. 2005 saw the festival further diversify its offerings, reaching out to a younger audience as well as those interested in more than just blues.

The 2006 edition saw continued growth with increased crowds and the move of the MBNA stage to the Lisgar Collegiate Institute to provide more capacity.

In 2007, Cisco Ottawa Bluesfest relocated to LeBreton Flats, a move from the site at Festival Plaza the previous year. The new site offered five stages in and around the Canadian War Museum. The stage set-up featured twin main stages akin to the Austin City Limits Music Festival, which allowed audiences to transfer between headlining acts.

The festival was renamed to the RBC Bluesfest in December 2011 after they became partners with the RBC Royal Bank to ensure its financial stability.

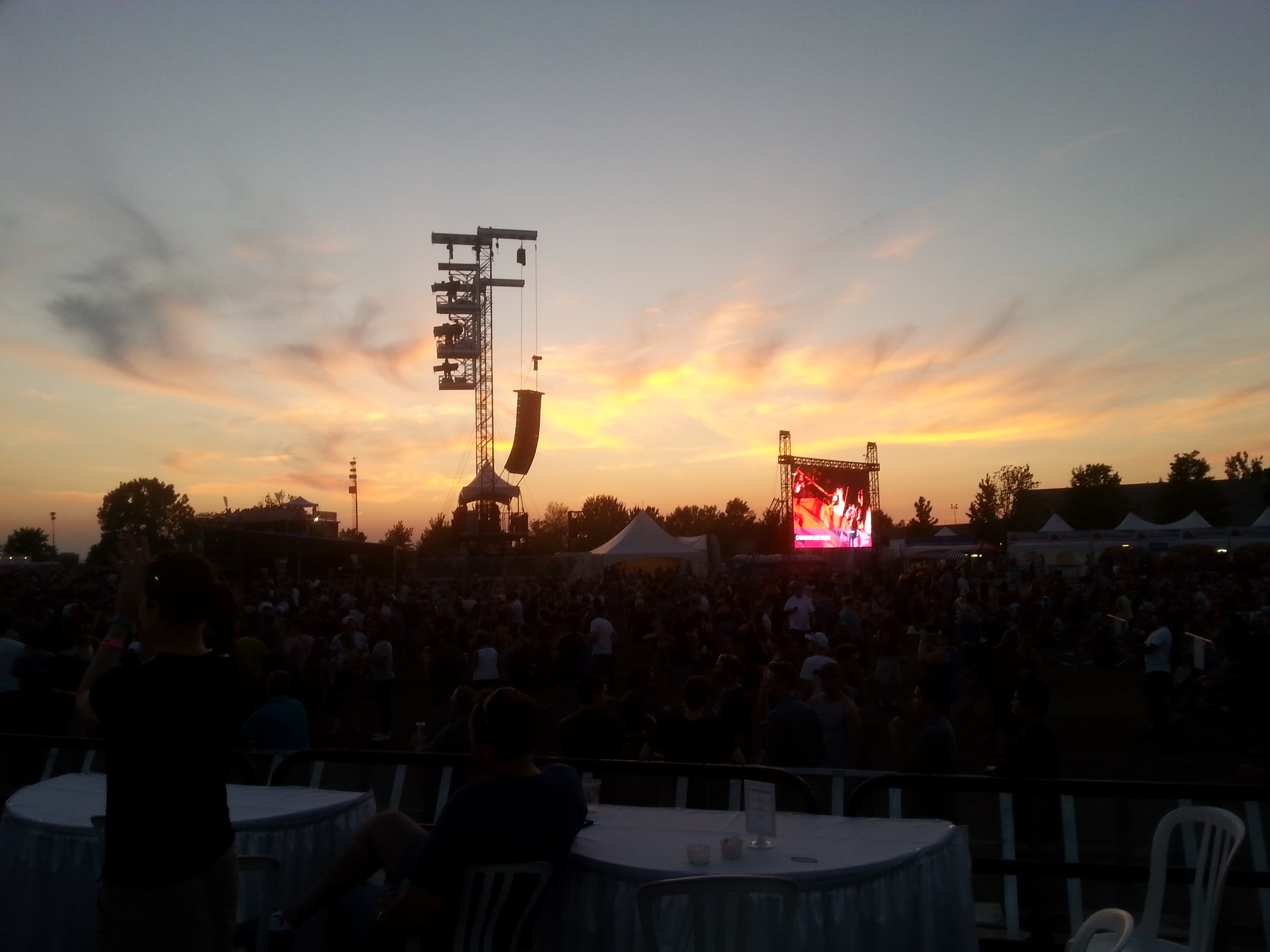
Sunset at the 2018 Bluesfest

Along with showcasing international musical talent, Bluesfest is a non-profit charitable organization with year-round music education initiatives such as Blues in the Schools, Be in the Band, and the Bluesfest School of Music and Art, augmenting a focus on developing local artists in the Ottawa region.

Since 2007, the festival continues to be held annually in July for nine days across five stages on LeBreton Flats. The festival's has increasingly showcased country, hip-hop, jazz, pop, and rock artists in its recent years, and usually shares a similar lineup to the Quebec City summer festival, which occurs around the same dates. The Bluesfest has become Ottawa's largest music festival and fourth largest in Canada, attracting nearly 300,000 people every year.

== Festival setting ==
The outdoor stages:

- RBC Stage (capacity of 30,000)
- Hard Rock Hotel & Casino Stage (capacity of 7,000)
- LeBreton Stage (capacity of 2,000)
- Spin Stage (capacity of 500)

The indoor venue:

- Barney Danson Theatre (capacity of 250)

== Incidents ==
On July 17, 2011, just 20 minutes into Cheap Trick’s set, a thunderstorm blew through the festival area. The band and crew narrowly escaped the collapse of the stage's 50-ton roof. It fell away from the audience and landed on the band's truck which was parked alongside the back of the stage, breaking the fall and allowing everyone about 30 seconds to escape. Robin Zander was treated for a laceration to the abdomen and released from hospital the same day.

=== Nesting Killdeer ===
During preparations for the 2018 festival, a pair of killdeer was found nesting on some cobblestones, which help camouflage the eggs. It was right where the main stage was about to be constructed. Killdeer and their nesting grounds are protected under the Migratory Birds Convention Act. With permission from Environment and Climate Change Canada, and help from the Woodlands Wildlife Sanctuary, the nest was successfully moved 25 meters, one meter at a time, to a protected area behind the stage site, and stage construction was allowed to continue after a 12-hour delay. It marked a first for successful killdeer nest relocation.

== See also ==
- Festival d'été de Québec
- List of festivals in Ottawa
- List of festivals in Canada
- Music of Canada
- List of blues festivals
- List of folk festivals
