= O-Town Hoedown =

Canadian country music concert series

The O-Town Hoedown was an annual country music concert series that began in Ottawa, Ontario, Canada in 2007. The event was owned and organized by Ottawa country singer Lefty McRighty. Performing artists were typically independent and unsigned, with the majority being local. O-Town Hoedown used the term "alt-whatever country music" to define the styles of music it featured, including alternative country, bluegrass, rockabilly, psychobilly, cowpunk, indie folk, outlaw country and neotraditional country.

== Format ==
The O-Town Hoedown took place over 9–10 days in early fall. Events were held at various small and medium-sized concert venues in Ottawa, similar to concert series such as South by Southwest and Canadian Music Week, with the exception that only one event was scheduled per day.

== See also ==
- List of country music festivals
- List of festivals in Ottawa
- Music in Canada
