= Great Lakes Museum =

Kingston Dry Dock Marine Museum of the Great Lakes
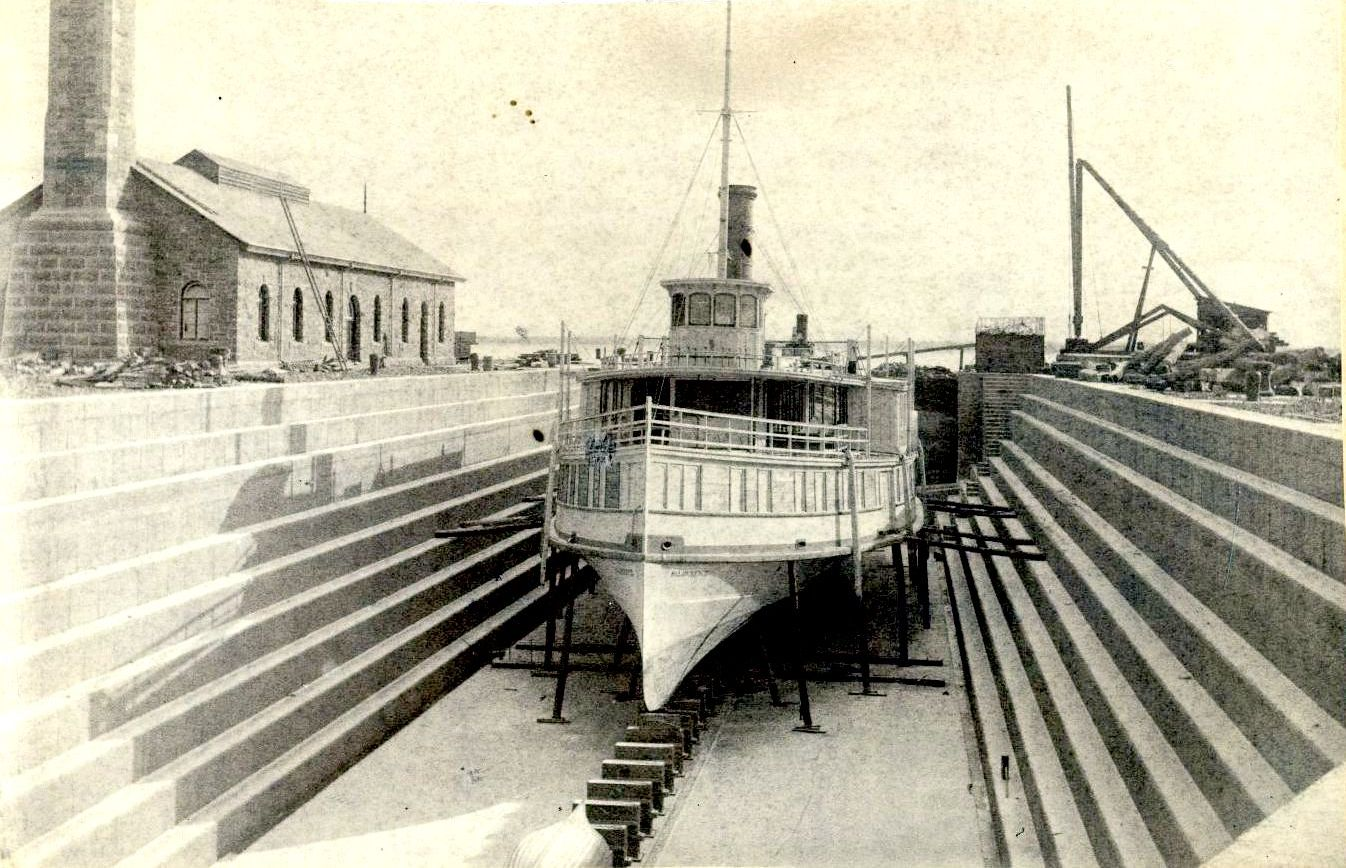

- Great Lakes Museum, Kingston
- Established: 1892 (as drydock); 1975 (as museum)
- Location: 55 Ontario St, Kingston, Ontario K7L 2Y2 +1 613 542 2261
- Coordinates: 44.2183798°N 76.5180818°W
- Type: marine museum
- Public transit access: 3, E6
- Website: greatlakesmuseum.ca

National Historic Site of Canada
- Designated: 1978

The Great Lakes Museum is a museum dedicated to marine history in the Great Lakes. It is located at 55 Ontario St. in Kingston, Ontario, which is also a designated National Historic Site of Canada.

== History ==
The Kingston Marine Museum was incorporated by letters patent on August 29, 1975 with objectives to collect, conserve and display artifacts related to Great Lakes marine history, shipping and shipbuilding, construct an exhibition area for special exhibitions of both marine and non-marine character, encourage public participation in events and activities, develop a marine resource centre of archival material, books, publications, ephemera and items to permit research activity related to Great Lakes marine history by the public, students, researchers and historians and to develop educational programs.

The museum was originally located in the 1892 Kingston Dry Dock, a national historic site in Kingston, Ontario, Canada. It should not be mistaken for Kingston Royal Naval Dockyard, which was a British naval base and home of the then Provincial Marine.

Once an important construction and repair facility for ships on the Great Lakes, the Kingston Dry Dock was constructed in 1890 by the Canadian federal government in what had been the local riding of Canadian prime minister Sir John A. Macdonald. Opened in 1892 by the Department of Public Works as a repair facility for lake vessels, the drydock provided dry working access to the ship below the waterline.

MacDonald lived long enough to see the $344,276 project targeted with allegations of political patronage after the March 5, 1891 Canadian election. As he suffered a series of strokes in 1891, one of which proved fatal on June 6 of that year, he would never have the opportunity to see the facility open and in operation.

The original 85.3-metre (279 ft 10 in) limestone dry dock was lengthened to 115.2 metres (377 ft 11 in) using concrete and leased in 1910 to the Kingston Shipbuilding Company; private companies would operate the Kingston Shipyards until 1968. During the Second World War naval vessels, notably corvettes, were built in this dry dock.

The site consists of a solid limestone 1891 main building which houses the drydock pumps and engines, an annex building added in 1915 and a smaller free-standing building added in 1938. The shipyard's distinctive square stone chimney stands 27 metres (90 ft) above the downtown city waterfront.

== Facilities and collections ==
The Museum consists of seven galleries. The temporary gallery features changing exhibits (such as a Kingston Warships 1812–1814 exhibit for the War of 1812 bicentennial). The six permanent galleries include the Donald Page gallery which examines several stories including the Age of Sail on the Great Lakes, life as a sailor and changing ship technology. This room used to be the Air Compressor and Tool room of the shipyards. The newest gallery, the Eco gallery, explores issues such as pollution, water diversion and conservation, invasive species and sustainable development as they relate to the Great Lakes. The Shipwreck Gallery leads from the early days of wooden ship building through to the construction of modern "Lakers". This room used to be the shipyard's Dynamo room. The Calvin Gallery covers Garden Island, where the Calvin family ran a shipbuilding and logging business and includes stories from Kingston's maritime past. This used to be the shipyard's boiler room. The Pump Room explores the complexity of operating a shipbuilding dry dock. The pumps and engines in this room were used to drain the dry dock and move the dock's caisson gate.

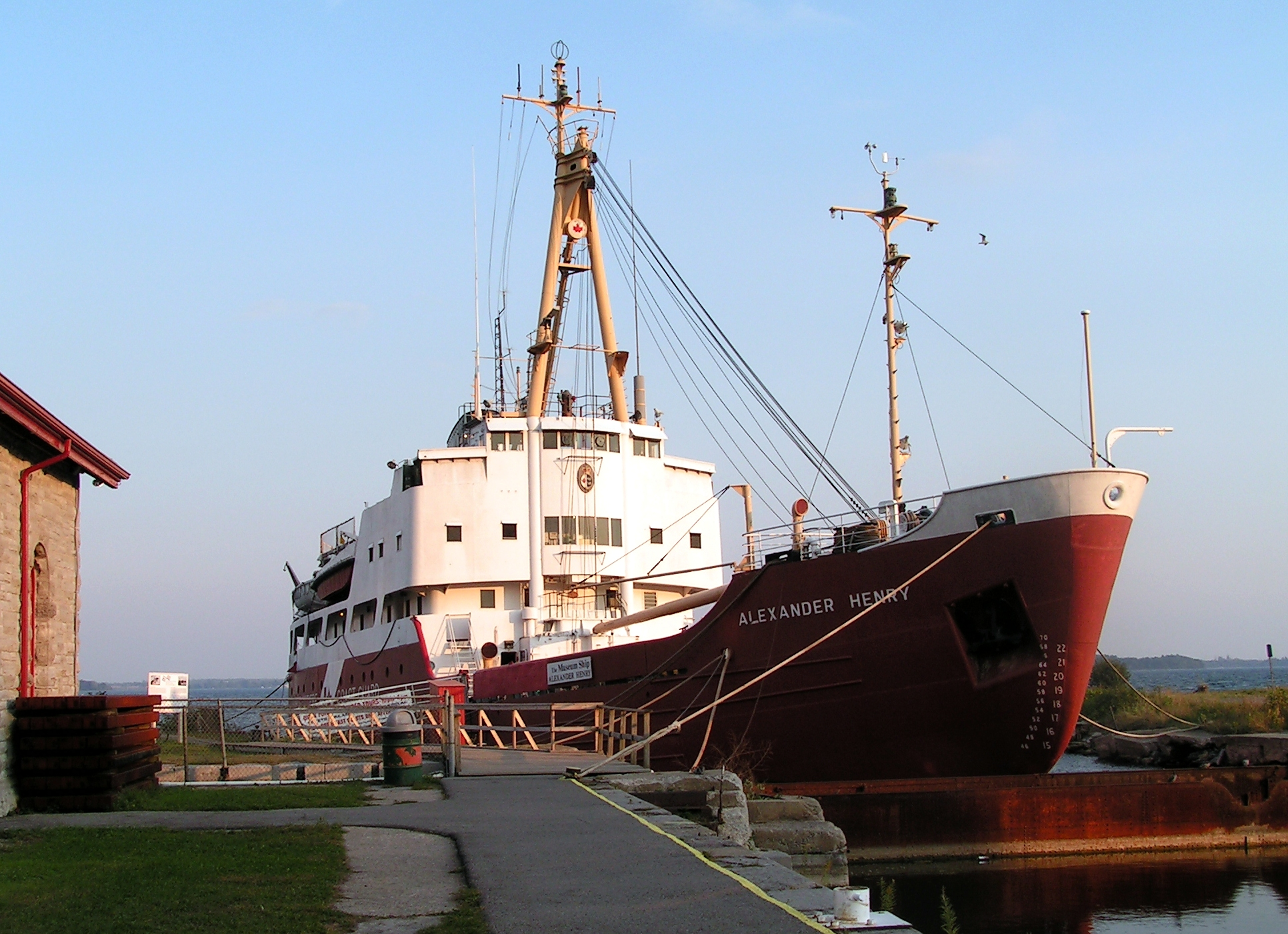
CCGS Alexander Henry served as an on-site museum ship until 2016

The Kingston Drydock buildings were converted into a year-round museum in the 1970s; Canadian retired Coast Guard ship CCGS Alexander Henry was decommissioned in 1985 and added to the site in 1986 as a museum ship.

Displays cover Great Lakes shipping since 1678; artifacts and exhibits include ship's models and engines, relics and instruments of lake vessels under both sail and steam, the drydock pumps and engine room of the original factory, glass and china salvaged from Great Lakes shipwrecks, ship's bells, anchors, binnacles, navigational instruments and equipment, a gallery of artistic paintings about the sea and the history of the Calvin and Son shipyard which once employed 700 workers on Garden Island.

The museum has photographed historic shipwrecks at risk of being hidden by encrustations of zebra mussels which infested the Great Lakes in the 1990s. Archaeological exhibits commemorating the War of 1812 on the Great Lakes were added for that war's bicentennial.

Publications of the museum include "FreshWater", a journal of Great Lakes marine history, a "Jib Gems" museum newsletter and several books on local marine history. Extensive archives and collections are maintained with the assistance of Queen's University, documenting 19th and 20th century Canadian Great Lakes marine heritage and ships and shipping from vessel design and construction through a ship's working life to shipwreck or retirement.

== Reopening ==
The museum future was clouded by the 2016 federal government decision to sell the property and resulting new landlord Patry Inc. requiring the museum to vacate the facility to allow for residential re-development. The museum galleries closed and the collections were moved into storage until the museum could find a new property to reopen to the public. The marine museum office was moved to 53 Yonge Street. In 2019 the museum received a donation from an unknown source, and repurchased the property after the re-developer could not come to agreement with the city on a residential high-rise. The museum plans to reopen after refurbishment and renovation. The museum was renamed the Great Lakes Museum in September 2023.

Since the closure of the museum, Alexander Henry was stored elsewhere and later transferred to Lakehead Transportation Museum in Thunder Bay, Ontario. However, after plans for the waterfront redevelopment of Port McNicoll, Ontario fell through, the museum received the Edwardian era-steamship SS Keewatin as a donation which had been a staple on the Port McNicoll waterfront. Keewatin arrived at Kingston on October 26, 2023. The ship opened for tours in May 2024.

== See also ==
- Wheelhouse Maritime Museum - former maritime museum in Ottawa; some of its exhibits were moved to the Great Lakes Museum
- Maritime Museum of the Atlantic in Halifax, Nova Scotia
- Toronto Maritime Museum - former maritime museum in Toronto
