= Ottawa International Children's Festival =

The Ottawa International Children's Festival is an annual May/June event in Ottawa, Canada featuring theatre, dance, and music for children. It is hosted on the grounds of LeBreton Flats Park and they use venues at the Canadian War Museum and the National Arts Centre.

The performing arts festival was established in 1985 and has hosted performers from Brazil, Peru, the Netherlands, France, England, Germany, Denmark, USA, China and Kenya, as well as Canadian artists.

Their mandate is to create a variety of programs for children aged two to fifteen, focusing on enriching school curriculum and promoting the arts as an integral part of children’s education.

The Ottawa International Children's Festival took place from May 10-14, 2024 in Ottawa, Canada. The festival featured a variety of international performing arts for children, including theatre, dance, and music.

== Awards ==
- The Lieutenant Governor’s Award for the Arts (2002)
- The Community Recognition Award from the Council for the Arts in Ottawa
- Honorary patronage by Her Excellency Governor General Michaëlle Jean (2006)
- Smoke-Free Champion Festivals Certificate Ottawa Public Health (2012)
