= Ottawa Fringe Festival =

Fringe festival in Ottawa, Ontario

The Ottawa Fringe Festival is an annual fringe theatre festival in Ottawa. The festival was inaugurated in 1997. The festival takes place for ten days each June. Performances are held indoors and out.

== Performance spaces ==
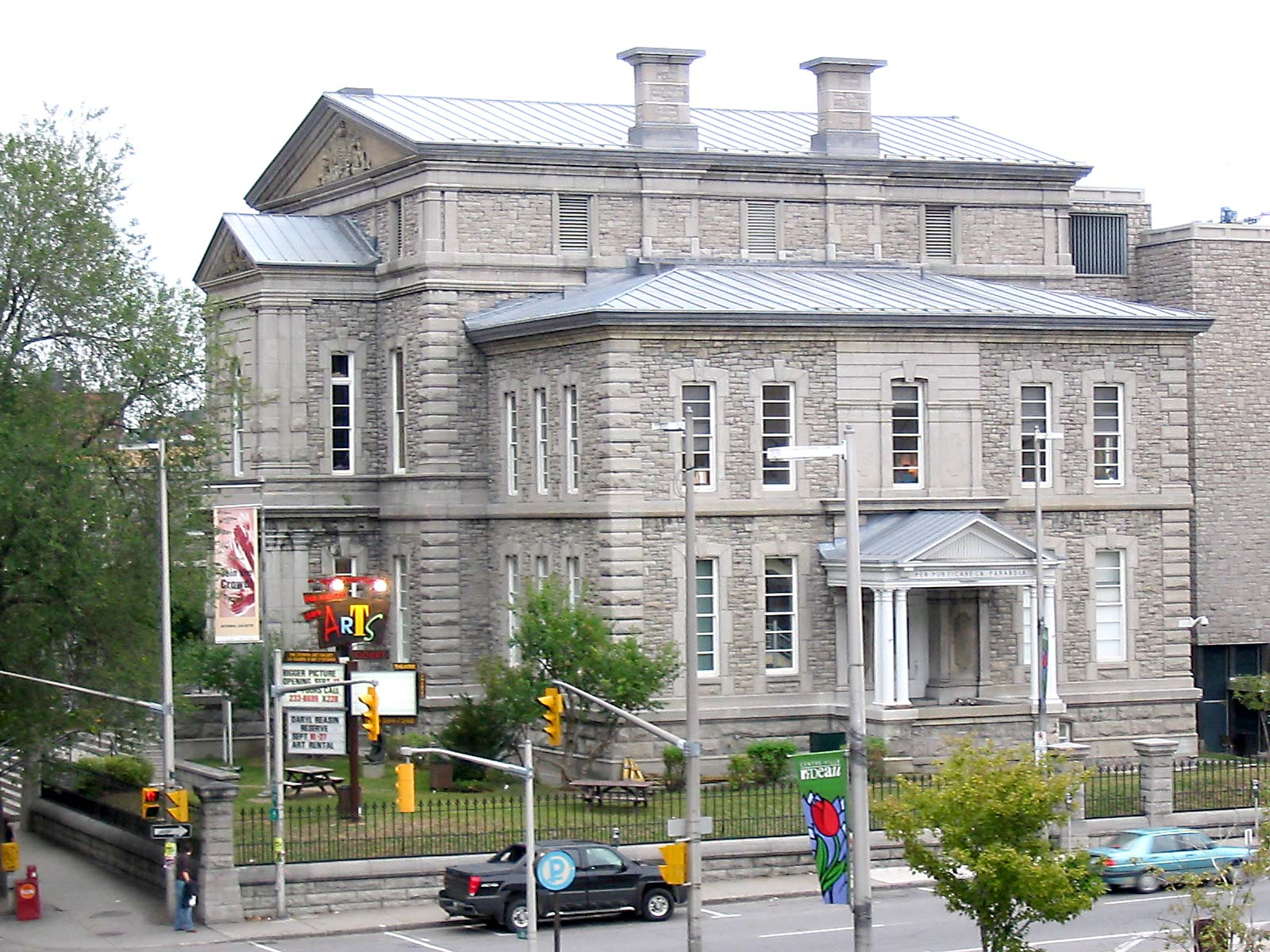
Ottawa Arts Court Building

Performances all take place in downtown Ottawa. Two of the regular stages are located at the University of Ottawa, including Studio Léonard-Beaulne and Academic Hall. Three others are located at Arts Court: Arts Court Theatre, Arts Court Library and Ottawa Dance Directive (ODD Box). The venues are all within walking distance of one another.

== Shows and attractions ==
Throughout the festival, a courtyard is set up just outside Arts Court to provide refreshment and a location for mingling with the artists.

Most Fringe performances are plays, and most last an hour or less. Since 2009, a limited number of 90-minute spots have been available. The content of the plays varies since acceptance to the festival is by lottery, and the shows are not juried. Because Ottawa is a bilingual city, both English and French productions are presented at the Fringe; however, a small number of productions in past years have been bilingual.

== Cost ==
Each patron must purchase a $3 Fringe Pin, which grants entry for the duration of the festival. Most performances are ticketed events, and require the purchase of a ticket on top of the Fringe Pin. Visitors aren't permitted entrance to ticketed performance unless they are wearing a Fringe Pin.

Tickets generally cost $12. For those attending multiple shows, discounted admission is available in the form of five- and ten-show passes, for $45 and $99 respectively. In keeping with the core mandate of the Canadian Association of Fringe Festivals, one hundred percent of the proceeds from ticket sales go to the performers.

== Performing at the Ottawa Fringe ==
The Fringe seeks to minimize its impact on the artistic decisions of its performers. Thus the festival allocates its limited stage time by lottery, with a certain percentage put aside for local, Canadian, and international troupes. Each winning troupe will get to perform its show in the same venue at different times, from a little after noon to midnight, over several days. The rotation of time slots helps to even out the audience-dampening effects of performing late at night or when most people are at work.

Since anyone able to meet an application fee can apply to perform at the Fringe, and berths are awarded by lottery, the quality of the shows can vary widely.

The Ottawa Fringe has spawned at least one international success. Ottawa playwright and actor Pierre Brault's one person show, Blood on the Moon, tells of the trial, (perhaps wrongful) conviction, and execution of Patrick J. Whelan for D'Arcy McGee's murder. After its successful Fringe run, Brault performed Blood on the Moon at the National Arts Centre, toured the show across Canada, and even brought it to Ireland.
