= Carnival of Cultures =

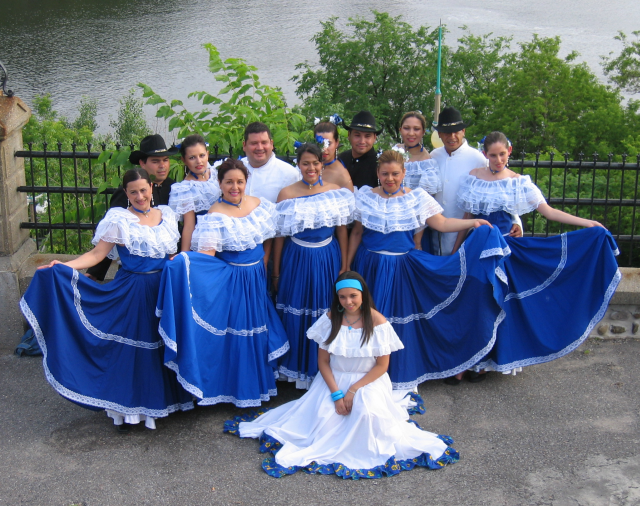
Carnival of Cultures performers

The Carnival of Cultures, also known as Ottawa's International Folkloric Festival, consists of cultural performances, featuring music, song and dance from around the world. It is usually located at the Marion Dewar Plaza in Ottawa. The festival started in 1992.

The 3 day event features over 400 artists featuring international folk arts in Ottawa. The event has included Sri Lankan, Venezuela, Filipinos, New Zealand, Lebanese, Mexican, Chinese, Scottish, Caribbean, Japanese, Colombian, Egypt, Latino, Inuit, Polish, Russian, Lebanese, Greek, Odyssey Dance Troupe, Modern jazz, and Ukrainian.

This festival not only celebrates cultures from around the world. "Carnival of Cultures exists for the purpose of promoting the creativity and artistic expression of artists whose works give new meaning to the folk arts. Through the preservation and transformation of traditional creations, these artists contribute to the longevity of the folk arts, making them accessible to the general public", says festival director Tony Yazbek.
