= Capital Idea! =

Music festival in Ottawa, Ontario, Canada

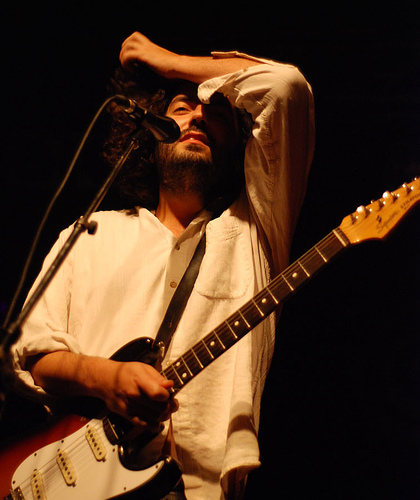
- Genre: Multigenre
- Dates: 21 to 30 June 2007
- Locations: Ottawa, Ontario, Canada
- Years active: 2007
- Founders: Calum Marsh

Capital Idea! was a nine-day music festival in Ottawa, Ontario, Canada, organized by music blogger and concert promoter Calum Marsh. The festival took place from 21 to 30 June 2007, and featured high-profile indie acts. Despite a great deal of media attention in television, print and internet outlets, the festival failed to attract a large number of attendees.

== Festival lineup ==
The 2007 edition of Capital Idea! included over 30 musical acts across a wide range of genres. A partial list follows.

The Walkmen, The Fiery Furnaces, Destroyer, Damo Suzuki, The Wrens, Sunset Rubdown, Girl Talk, Russian Futurists, Born Ruffians, Frog Eyes, Crystal Castles and Montag.

== See also ==
- Pop Montreal
