= Canadian Children's Museum =

Children's museum in Canada

Coordinates: 45°25′45″N 075°42′32″W

- Musée canadien des enfants
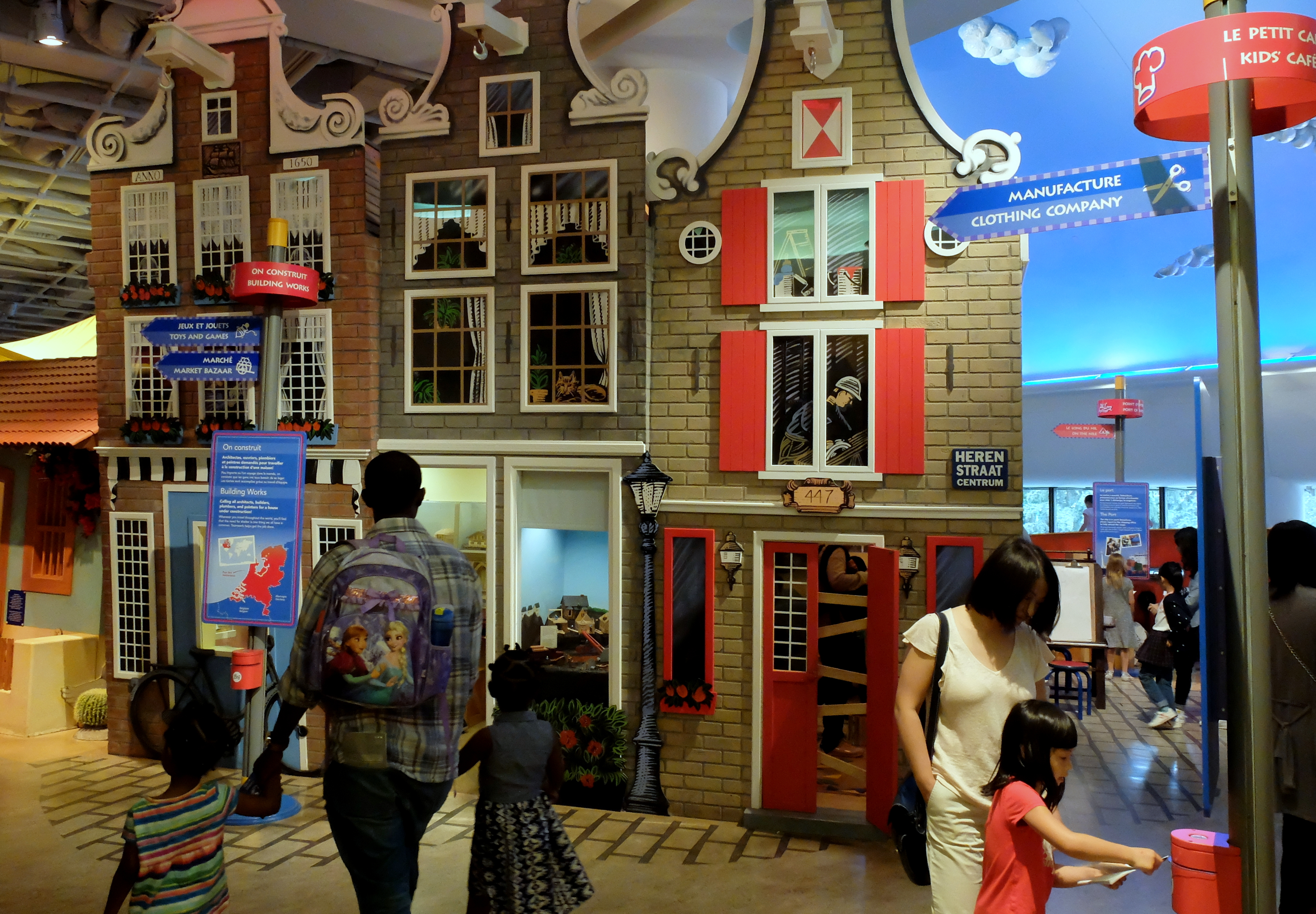
- Exhibits at the Canadian Children's Museum
- Established: 1989
- Location: Canadian Museum of History, Gatineau, Quebec, Canada
- Type: Children's museum
- Website: www.historymuseum.ca/visit/childrens-museum/

The Canadian Children's Museum (CCM) is a children's museum and exhibition operated by the Canadian Museum of History in Gatineau, Quebec, Canada. The CCM attracts about half a million visitors each year. It is also Canada's largest exhibition centre (3,000 m^{2} (32,000 sq ft)) designed specifically for children up to age 14 and their adult companions.

== History ==
The Children's Museum opened in 1989 when the Canadian Museum of History (then known as the Canadian Museum of Civilization) moved into its current building in Gatineau. The Canadian Museum of History has expanded the exhibition twice since its opening, first in 1994 and again in 2007. At the end of July 2007, it welcomed its eight-millionth visitor. The museum announced that it would undertake a major renewal project from January 2020. It reopened in May 2022.

== Exhibits ==
Most of the space is devoted to the museum's permanent exhibition The Great Adventure (French: La Grande Aventure). This displays multi-cultural destinations (Nigeria, Japan, India, Mexico, Indonesia) geared towards children 14 and under. The exhibit contains activities geared towards children, including a library and theater. The CCM also presents a changing line-up of special exhibitions curated internally or acquired from other institutions.

In September 2022, the museum opened a one-year exhibition titled, "From Pepinot to PAW Patrol – Television of Our Childhoods," which explores 70 years of television programming for children. It features approximately a hundred shows in English, French, and indigenous languages. The exhibition was developed in collaboration with CBC/Radio-Canada and with the participation of Télé-Québec.

== Collections ==
The Children's Museum has a permanent collection of more than 15,000 items for use in its exhibitions and programs. The items include artifacts, toys, games, clothing, art, photographs and other objects from around the world that relate to the lives of children, past and present.

== Affiliations ==
The CCM is a member of the international Association of Children's Museums, and the only Canadian member of the Youth Museums Exhibit Collaborative.
