= CityFolk Festival =

Folk music festival held in Ottawa, Canada

- Locations: Lansdowne Park, Ottawa, Ontario, Canada
- Years active: 1994-present
- Attendance: 225,000 (2023, 5 days total)
- Capacity: 45,000 (all stages combined)
- Website: cityfolkfestival.com

The CityFolk Festival (known until 2014 as the Ottawa Folk Festival) is a folk music festival held annually in Ottawa, Ontario, Canada.

== Format ==
The festival is held on the Great Lawn at Lansdowne Park each September as a 4- or 5-day general admission ticketed event. As well as the main stage, there is a secondary stage inside Aberdeen Pavilion.

While its origins are in Canadian folk music, since 2011 the festival has also spotlighted other genres, including alt-country, hip-hop, roots, and blues.

Recent headliners include Robert Plant (2019), Hozier (2018), David Byrne, (2018), Jack Johnson (2017), Van Morrison (2015), Wilco (2015), Lorde (2014), Blue Rodeo (2014), Emmylou Harris (2013) and Kendrick Lamar (2013).

In addition to musical performances, the festival features local craft beer and artisans, festival food, and an offshoot event called Marvest – free concerts featuring emerging talent, held in local businesses.

== Festival headliners ==
CityFolk (2014 -)

Robert Plant, Hozier, David Byrne, Jack Johnson, Vance Joy, James Bay, Van Morrison, The Avett Brothers, Wilco, Of Monsters and Men, UB40, Walk Off The Earth, Elle King, and Lucinda Williams

Ottawa Folk Festival (1994–2013)

Kendrick Lamar, Lorde, Emmylou Harris, Joss Stone, Great Big Sea, Ben Harper, Bon Iver, Blue Rodeo, The Levon Helm Band, Jim Cuddy, Feist, Kris Kristofferson, Rufus Wainwright, Valdy, David Wiffen, Murray McLauchlan, Quartette, Bruce Cockburn, The Sadies, Roy Forbes, Connie Kaldor, Broken Social Scene, Martin Sexton, Jerry Douglas, Jane Siberry, Blackie and the Rodeo Kings, Jorane, Jesse Cook, Odetta, Kate & Anna McGarrigle, John Prine, Stephen Fearing, Richard Thompson, Buffy Sainte-Marie, La Bottine Souriante, Arlo Guthrie, Natalie MacMaster, Steve Earle, Sarah Harmer, and Ron Sexsmith.

== Festival organization ==
The festival was established in 1994 by Max Wallace (Station Manager of the community radio station CKCU-FM and the festival's Director for its first two years of operation, 1994 & 1995) and Chris White (a local singer-songwriter) and a large committee of volunteers. First held on Victoria Island (Ottawa River), it moved to Britannia in 1995 where it remained until 2010.

From 2011–2014 the festival was held at Hog's Back Park in central Ottawa. The team behind Ottawa Bluesfest began to produce the festival in 2011.

The festival was held at Lansdowne Park from 2015 until 2025. Starting in 2026 it was relocated to the Festival Grounds at the RA Centre. Mark Monahan is the current executive and artistic director.

== History ==
The festival was established 15 years after the demise of the Festival for the Folks (1976–1979), a previous folk festival in Ottawa. The first Festival of the Folks (1976) was held in Brewer Park and organized by Sheldon Wilner (CUSA programmer) and Jim Wright (CUSA Finance Commissioner).

The first Ottawa Folk Festival was held on Victoria Island, a small island between Ottawa and Gatineau in the Ottawa River. It ran only a single day, on August 28, 1994. Headliners on the inaugural festival included Valdy and David Wiffen. From this initial festival until 2006, the folk festival was formally known as the CKCU Ottawa Folk Festival acknowledging the support of the CKCU-FM radio station at Carleton University.

In its second year, the festival moved to Britannia Park, a large park near historic Britannia village in the west end of Ottawa. Britannia Park was also home for the Festival of the Folks for its final three years, and would remain the folkfest's home until 2010. The festival was also extended to run for two days (Saturday and Sunday) that year; in 1996, it was extended to run three days beginning with Friday evening concerts.

In 1996, the festival had cash flow problems that almost broke the organization. The festival retains close ties with Arlo Guthrie who performed at the two sold-out benefit concerts in that year that enabled the festival to continue. In more recent times, the festival has turned toward the inclusion of non-folk and mainstream artists (such as a 2010 performance by Arrested Development and 2005 performance by Canadian Idol Kalan Porter) in an effort to boost attendance.

The festival underwent major changes in 2011. Facing a heavy debt-load which was exacerbated by heavy rain and high winds on the final day of the festival in 2010, the festival board accepted an offer from Ottawa Bluesfest organizers to take over the running of the festival. The new management moved the festival to Hog's Back Park near Mooney's Bay along the Rideau River.

In 2014 the festival was rebranded as CityFolk and relocated to Lansdowne Park.

Due to major reconstruction going on at Landsdowne Park, it was moved to the Festival Grounds at the RA Centre in 2026.

== Volunteers ==
The festival is supported by hundreds of volunteers, who are trained in specialty areas and allow the festival to operate. The volunteers collectively are the biggest sponsor in terms of how much their time contribution would cost the festival if these positions were paid. Students who are volunteers can receive Ontario high school credit for their participation.

== See also ==
- List of festivals in Canada
- Music of Canada
