= Ottawa International Writers Festival =

Canadian literary festival

The Ottawa International Writers Festival is a literary festival which takes place twice annually, in spring and fall, in Ottawa, Ontario, Canada. The festival was founded in 1997 by Irish-born Neil Wilson as, according to Wilson, "an excuse to bring over Irish poets and writers," but would expand into a The festival began to run twice a year in 2004. Each edition of the festival features speakers and authors from across Canada and around the world, giving talks and readings on topics ranging from poetry and fiction to current events, science, philosophy, politics, music, film, history and biography. There are also stand-alone events held throughout the year, and a children's program that brings children's authors to schools and libraries. It is considered one of Canada's greatest literary festivals.

The festival's current major venue is the Christchurch Cathedral Centre, although events are also held in other locations in Ottawa.
