= Music and Beyond =

Poster for Music and Beyond's inaugural season

Music and Beyond is a Canadian summer music festival, featuring classical music in its varying formations (orchestras, choirs, bands, baroque groups and small ensembles) as well as a spectrum of art forms and cultural disciplines (visual art, drama, film, poetry, dance, architecture, science, yoga, tai chi, food and wine). Music and Beyond is also a not-for-profit organization with charitable status. First held in 2010, it has since become an annual event, taking place at local venues in Ottawa, Ontario. The 2018 festival took take place from July 4–17.

Music and Beyond attracts audiences from around the world, as it maintains a broad spectrum of performers. Hundreds of performers have appeared at the festival such as soprano Kathleen Battle; pianists Peter Serkin, Menahem Pressler and Janina Fialkowska; the Emerson String Quartet; the Hilliard Ensemble; Daniel Taylor and the Theatre of Early Music; Emma Kirkby; the Chamber Players of Canada; the Canadian Brass; Les Violons du Roy; and the National Arts Centre Orchestra. Further, actor Christopher Plummer performed Shakespeare and Music in 2011; best-selling mystery writer Peter Robinson performed in 2010; and Philip Craig, one of Canada’s most successful visual artists, participated in both 2010 and 2011.

== History ==
Music and Beyond was founded by Canadian cellist Julian Armour. Armour had previously founded Ottawa Chamber Music Society (OCMS)/Ottawa International Chamber Music Festival. He was also president of the Ottawa Festival Network from 2003 to 2009. Armour remains the festival’s Executive and Artistic Director, as well as the Artistic Director of the Chamber Players of Canada, Chamber Music Programmer for Galaxie, and Principal Cellist of the chamber orchestra Thirteen Strings.

In its first year, the Music and Beyond festival ran for 11 days and offered 82 performances at various local venues. The festival was very well received, with exceptional reviews from both the press and the public. Some events were radio broadcast on CBC Radio and Radio-Canada, reaching hundreds of thousands of Canadians. People traveled from right across Canada, the United States and even Europe to attend the inaugural 2010 Festival.

2011 built on the success of the first year. Music and Beyond ran for 11 days and included 72 performances. It opened with an evening of Shakespeare and Music featuring actor Christopher Plummer. Most events sold out and attendance totalled 31,100. Several concerts were again recorded by CBC Radio and Radio-Canada, and the total radio audience topped one million.

2014 – Music and Beyond's 5th anniversary. The Festival had strong attendance from beginning to end, with several concerts at absolute capacity, each attracting more than one thousand fans to a single event.

78.4% of the people who responded to this year's surveys stated that Music and Beyond greatly enhanced their image of the National Capital Region. Music and Beyond’s web site received 258,122 visitors and 2,982,583 page hits from 94 different countries this year.
