= Westfest =

Free arts festival in Ottawa, Ontario, Canada

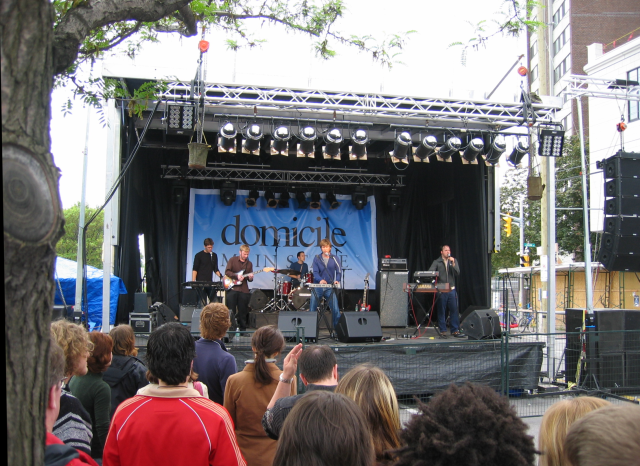
Hilotrons at Westfest 2006

Westfest is a free arts festival in Ottawa, Ontario, taking place the second weekend of June, at Tom Brown Arena and Park, in the Hintonburg area of Ottawa. The festival brings in over 300 artists, 150 volunteers and 40 staff over the weekend and features only Canadian talent. Westfest has been dedicated to bringing into the spotlight up and coming Canadian talent, while also featuring some of the best known names in the scene. The festival was founded in 2003 by Elaina Martin. The range of artistic disciplines includes music, contemporary dance, visual art, media art, performance art, spoken word, poetry and fiction readings, Aboriginal art forms, and children's entertainment.

== History ==
The festival's first year, 2004, saw Jane Siberry as its first headliner, and set the tone for the future of the annual celebration.

One year later, in 2005, Westfest became a two-day festival. In 2006, Westfest was incorporated as a national not for profit organization and by 2007, became a three-day festival with extensive programming. In 2008, Westfest celebrated its fifth anniversary with a five-day event and more than 100 hours of programming, drawing in record breaking crowds, exceeding 100,000 people, to the festival's grounds.

Westfest took place in 2011 on June 10, 11, and 12 and featured performances by Lucie Idlout, Bif Naked, and the Mighty Popo. In 2011, the Westfest main stage was positioned behind the Real Canadian Superstore parking lot, a strategy that would quadruple the space create a fully licensed audience area.

In 2012, Westfest took place June 8, 9, and 10 with headliners such as Steven Page, The Cooper Brothers, and the Hidden Cameras as well as family activities.

Westfest's programming is 100% Canadian and 100% accessible, and since the beginning, admission to Westfest has been free to anyone wishing to attend. Westfest is also 100% inclusive and participating artists have come from all over Canada; from every province and territory, including Nunavut.

== Past musical performers ==
2004: Jane Siberry; Adrienne Pierce; Ember Swift; Junkyard Symphony/Garbage and Guitars; Andrew Vincent and the Pirates; Recoilers; Susan O; Lori Jean; Greenfield Main; The Vanity Press; Neil Gerster; The Dunn Project

2005:Cowboy Junkies; Danny Michel; Lynn Miles; Gentleman Reg; Ember Swift; Mighty Popo; Lee Hayes, Mina & Taqralik; The Lowbellies; The Vanity Press; Amanda Rheaume; Meredith Luce; Amy Campbell; Craig Hinman; Juluan Armour, Giulaine Lemaire, Renee-Paule Gauthier

2006: Skydiggers; The Cash Brothers; Jim Bryson; Elliot Brood; Emm Gryner; Justin Rutledge; Ember Swift; The Cliks; Bigstone Drummers; Hilotrons; The Acorn; Kellylee Evans; Peggy White; Nukariik; The Habit; Joshua Morin; Bleeding Heart; Dr. Lee (Westfest Tam Tam), Musicians of the Ottawa Chamber Orchestra

2007: Kathleen Edwards; Fiftymen; Shanneyganock; Dr. Lee; Bigstone Drummers; Camp Radio; Jason Collett; Crowded Skies; Angela Desveaux; Lindsay Ferguson; Lily Frost; The Golden Dogs; The Graveyard Dogs; Marie-Josee Houle; Hunter Valentine; The John Henrys; Jupiter Ray Project; Mackenzie MacBride & The Super Model Syndrome; Ana Miura; Nukariik; The Old Youth; Andy Swan; Slo' Tom; Eric Vieweg

2008: Buffy Sainte-Marie; Lucie Idlout; Holly McNarland; Kinnie Starr; Leela Gilday; Tamara Podemski; Nukariik; Kateri Akiwenzie-Damm; Nemisak Singers; First Nations Cultural Performers; 1755; Marie-Jo Therio; Julie Doiron; Joel Plaskett Emergency; Land of Talk; Grand Analog; Matthew Barber and the Union Dues; i see rowboats; Hurray for Higgsfield

2009:Danny Michel and the Camp Town Racers; Jenn Grant; Arctic; Prairie Oyster; Lynne Hanson; Ladies of the Canyon; Lake of Stew; Jan Purcell and the Pine Road Bluegrass Band; Ken Voita; The Acorn; Dave Draves; Rudeboy; Boom Creek; Sarandonga Tropical Band; Jenna Glatt; Glenn Nuotio; Jenna Taggart

2010: Sloan, Will Currie & The Country French; The Balconies; The High Dials; Bloomistry; Dala; Nukariik; Madison Violet; Marigolds; Peggy White; MonkeyJunk; The White Wires; TokyoSexWhale; GOOD2GO; The Kingmakers; Ken Workman and the Union; Autumns Canon; EFARM; The Moonrunners; Choice Grade; In Progress

2011: Lucie Idlout; Kaiva; Tanya Tagaq; Tumivut; Taqralik Partridge; M.O (Eskimocentricity); Bif Naked; The Pack A.D; The Johnnys; Hexes and Ohs; Mighty Popo; Marc Charron; The Murder Plans; Silver Creek; The Flats; The Jeers

2012: Hidden Cameras; SILKKEN LAUMANN; The Cougar Chick Tribute Band; Dr. Lee; Steven Page; Amos The Tansparent; Brock Stonefish; The Haybirds; Liam Titcomb; Cooper Brothers; The Joynt; Riot Police; John Allaire; Andrea Simms Karp; Ty Hall; Tara Holloway; Al Wood and the Woodsmen; Churchill School of Rock; Big Soul Project

2013: Jill Zmud; Juliana Pullford; Captain Dirt & the Skirt; Zoe Whittall; Jane Siberry; The Clicks; Holly McNarland; Plex; Andrew Vincent; rob mclennan; Elliott Brood; The Johnnys; Lynne Hanson; Jim Bryson; Cindy Baker; Greg Frankson; Skydiggers; Dr. Lee; Amos the Transparent; Silver Creek; Amanda Rheaume; Cara Tierney; Fiftymen.

2014: A Tribe Called Red; Ashley MacIsaac; George Leach; The PepTides; River City Junction; The Fevers; Brock Zeman; Dr. Lee Tam-Tam; Good2Go; The Last Supper; DJ LAKES DISTRIKT; Maria Hawkins; Pony Girl; Shawnee; Smoke Wagon Blues

2015: Sarah Harmer; Lynn Miles & Friends; Craig Cardiff; The Acorn; Rae Spoon; Terry Gillespie; Steve Judd & The Underdogs; Thomas Clair with River City Junction; Yo Mama; Elizabeth Riley Band; Southern Mud; Kris + Dee; Theland Kicknosway; Danielle Eyer; Dr. Lee Tam Tam; DJ Lakes District
