= Gambling in Quebec =

Gambling in Quebec includes Casino gambling in most crowded cities of the region, Lottery, Société des casinos du Québec and Sports betting. Games of chance have existed during the prohibition era but became legal in Quebec only in 1985 when gambling was made legal in the country. Unlike most Canadian provinces where the minimum age for gambling is nineteen, in Quebec, along with Alberta and Manitoba, the minimum age is eighteen.

== Lottery ==
Gambling in Quebec is controlled by a government corporation Loto-Québec. It was created for control and operation of legal gambling authorities in Québec. To permit lottery schemes in provinces, Loto-Québec was started in December 1969 after the emendation of the Canadian Criminal Code and set up the first lottery in the country. The corporation began ticket sales for the monthly passive game Inter Loto fast on the heels of the foundation. The first drawing of that lottery was dated March 14, 1970. Additional games launched that year included the weekly Mini and the quarterly Super.

In 1971, Loto-Perfecta was launched by Loto-Québec with a new mechanical wager-registration system. A differentiating feature of that lottery was the determination of its results - by horse races. Move towards a new era, and video games started in 1978 when Loto-Québec launched its first computerized terminal games. The first game title of that time, 6 /36 lotto, still exists and is available to play.

Net revenues from Loto-Québec operations are turned over to the government, and the funds are used, in part, to finance health and education services, infrastructure improvements, and provincial debt reduction.

== Société des casinos du Québec ==
Loto-Québec is a huge government corporation, and for the more particular control of the industry, it has a couple of separate and several subsidiaries. The Société des casinos du Québec - is one of such subsidiaries. It is a supervisor of four casinos running in the Quebec province by the government: Casino de Charlevoix, Casino de Montréal, Casino du Lac-Leamy and Casino de Mont-Tremblant.

In December 1992, Quebec authorities announced the approval of the construction project of two casinos run by the government. Montreal's casino on Île Notre-Dame was the first one, and a gambling facility at Pointe-au-Pic in the Charlevoix region was the second casino from that announcement.

As the major government corporation created for the gambling control, Loto-Québec delegates its authorities not only with the Société des casinos du Québec Inc but also with such subsidiaries as Resto-Casino Inc and Casiloc Inc. The Société des casinos du Québec Inc is in charge of building and constructing the casinos and overseeing their operation processes. Resto-Casino Inc operates all the restaurants and bars on the territory of the casinos. Casiloc Inc assumes responsibility for acquiring, building and overseeing casino facilities.

== Casinos ==
This is an incomplete list of casinos in Quebec as of around 2012:

Type:
Resort (R)
Destination (D)
Community (C)
Racing entertainment centre (REC)

Ownership:
Government owned (GO)
First Nations (FN)
Private facility (PF)
Privately operated (PO)
Charitable (C)
Not-for-profit (NFP)

Facilities:
Slots (S)
Slots-At-Racetracks (SAR)
Racino (R)
Video lottery terminal (V)

				Type				Ownership						Facilities			
Name	Region/city	Prov.	Est.	R	D	C	REC	GO	FN	PF	PO	C	NFP	S	SAR	R	V
Casino de Montréal	Montreal	QC	1993					check						check			
Casino de Charlevoix	La Malbaie	QC	1994					check						check			
Casino du Lac-Leamy	Gatineau	QC	1996					check									
Casino du Mont-Tremblant	Mont-Tremblant	QC	2009					check									
Hippodrome d'Aylmer	Aylmer	QC	2008													check	check
Hippodrome de Montréal	Montreal	QC	2008													check	check
Hippodrome De Québec	Quebec City	QC	2008													check	check
Ludoplex Trois-Rivières	Trois-Rivières	QC	2008														
Ludoplex Québec	Quebec City	QC	2008														
Playground Poker Club	Kahnawake	QC	2010											check			
Onliner Casino	Quebec City	QC	2021			check								check			check

== Sports betting ==
Many of the leading bookmakers from the 1930s to the 1960s got their start during the prohibition era of the 1920s. But sports betting became legal in Quebec only in 1985 when gambling was made legal in the country. It took several years before the gaming sector in Quebec grew to its current size. In 2021 the igaming market makes around $80 billion a year and average operator makes $2 million.

== Bibliography ==
- Davies, Richard (2001). Betting the Line Columbus, Ohio: The Ohio State University Press ISBN 0-8142-0880-0
