= Casino de Charlevoix =

Casino in Quebec, Canada

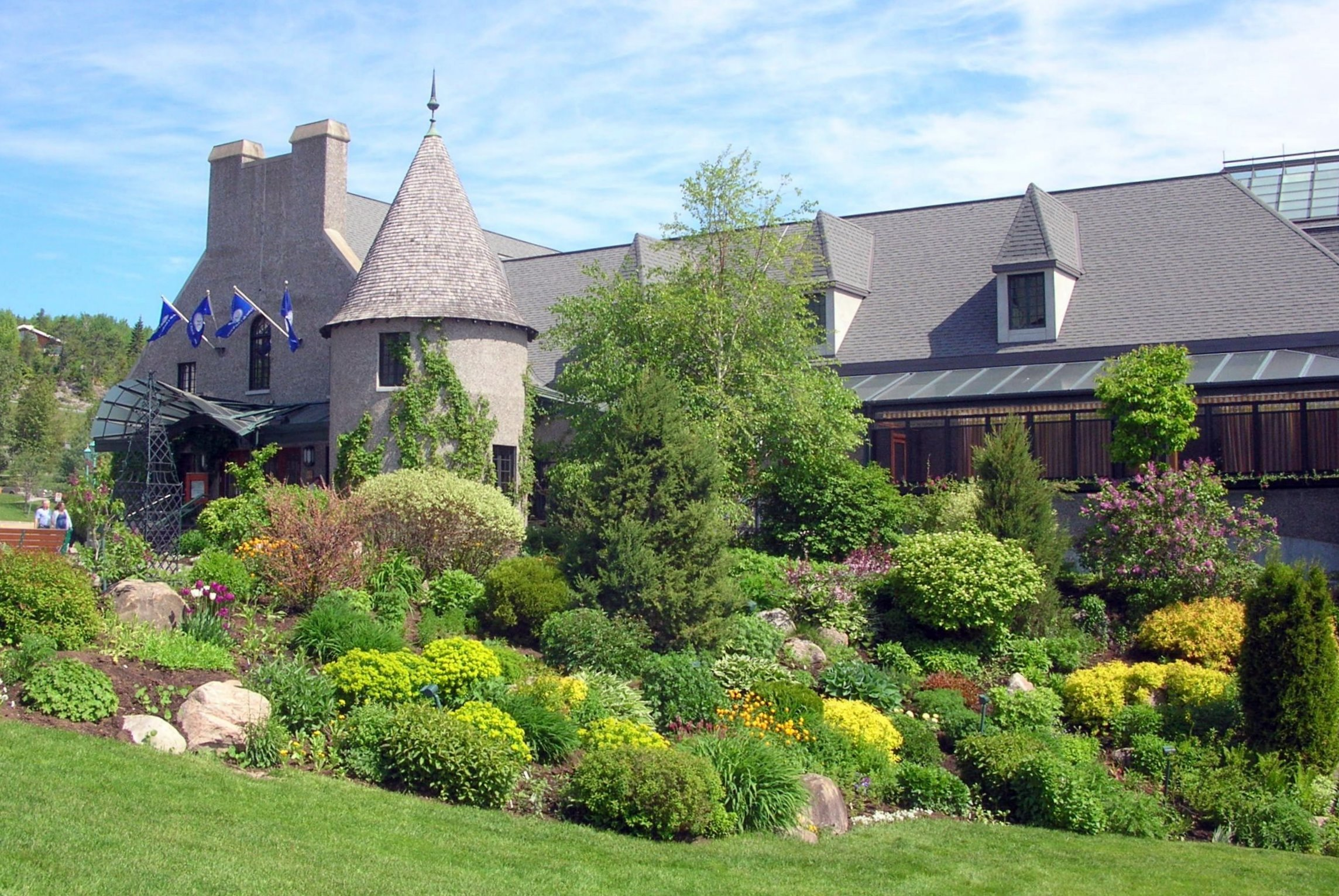
- Casino de Charlevoix; June 4, 2006

- Location within Quebec
- Interactive map of Casino de Charlevoix
- Location: 183, rue Richelieu La Malbaie, Quebec G5A 1X8; 47°37′17″N 70°08′40″W
- Opened: June 24, 1994
- No. of rooms: 405 (at Manoir Richelieu)
- Gaming space: 20 tables 800 slot machines
- Signature attractions: spa, health club, golf course
- Casino type: Land-based
- Owner: Société des casinos du Québec & Fairmont
- Renovated in: 1998–1999
- Website: www.casino-de-charlevoix.com/charlevoix/en/home

The Casino de Charlevoix is located in Pointe-au-Pic, now part of La Malbaie, about 150 kilometres (93 mi) east of Quebec City. The historic Manoir Richelieu hotel is located right next to the casino. Charlevoix is a very popular tourist destination because of its location, next to the Saint Lawrence River and the Laurentian Mountains.

== History ==
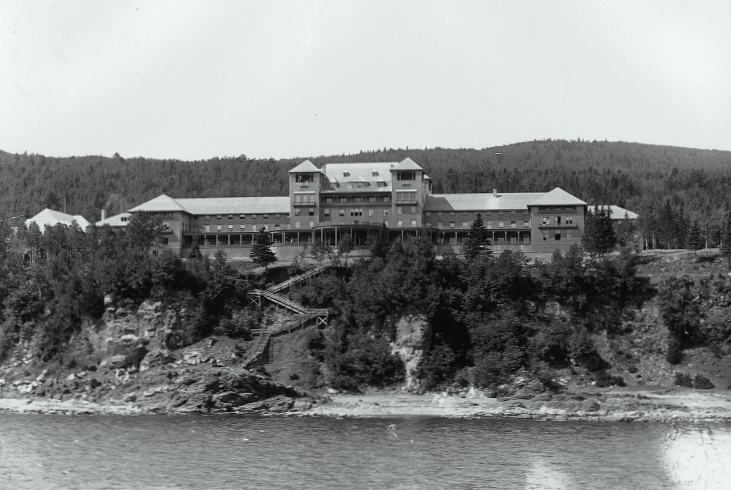
Original Le Manoir Richelieu c. 1899

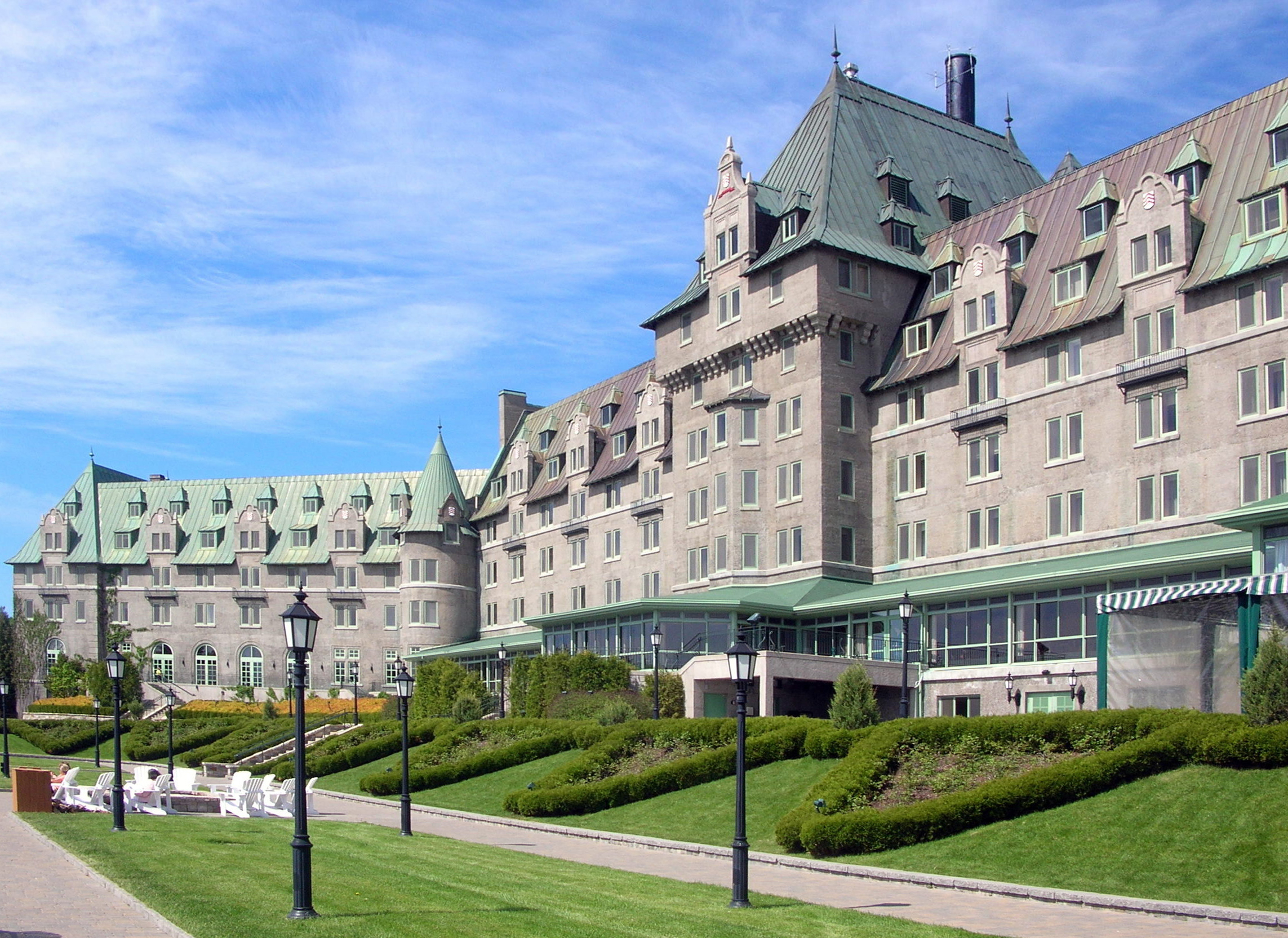
Le Manoir Richelieu

Inaugurated on June 24, 1994, the Casino de Charlevoix was established in the Manoir Richelieu's former summer playhouse on the cliffs of Pointe-au-Pic, a panoramic site visited by vacationers for over a century.

The current hotel was built in 1928–1929, using the Châteauesque style, by architect John Archibald to replace the original 250 room structure (1899) that was destroyed in a fire.

Owned by Canada Steamship Lines, it was sold in 1966 to Warnock Hersey. In 1971, the hotel was sold to Irish football star John Dempsey, then to the provincial government in 1975 and Raymond Malenfant in 1986.

In 1998, Loto-Québec teamed up with Canadian Pacific Hotels and the Solidarity Fund QFL to acquire the Manoir Richelieu (now called Fairmont Le Manoir Richelieu), renovate it and expand the Casino de Charlevoix. Reopening in June 1999, the complex has since become a world-class resort. The Casino de Charlevoix also became the first of Québec's casinos to be linked to a hotel.

== Facts and figures ==
The Casino de Charlevoix offers more than 20 gaming tables and 800 slot machines.

Fairmont Le Manoir Richelieu is a hotel with 405 rooms, a Conference Center which accommodates over 1,000 people, a spa, a health club, two all-season outdoor pools, and a 27-hole golf course.

During the 2005–2006 fiscal year, the Casino de Charlevoix generated annual sales totalling $47.6 million and received 1 million visitors.

== See also ==
- Société des casinos du Québec
- Casino de Montréal
- Casino du Lac-Leamy
- Loto-Québec
- Charlevoix Railway
