= Société des casinos du Québec =

- Company type: Subsidiary
- Founded: 1992
- Headquarters: Montreal, Quebec, Canada
- Products: Casinos, Video Lottery Terminals, and Bingo
- Revenue: CA$$758.5 million (2005–2006)
- Owner: Loto-Québec
- Number of employees: 6,000
- Website: casinos.lotoquebec.com

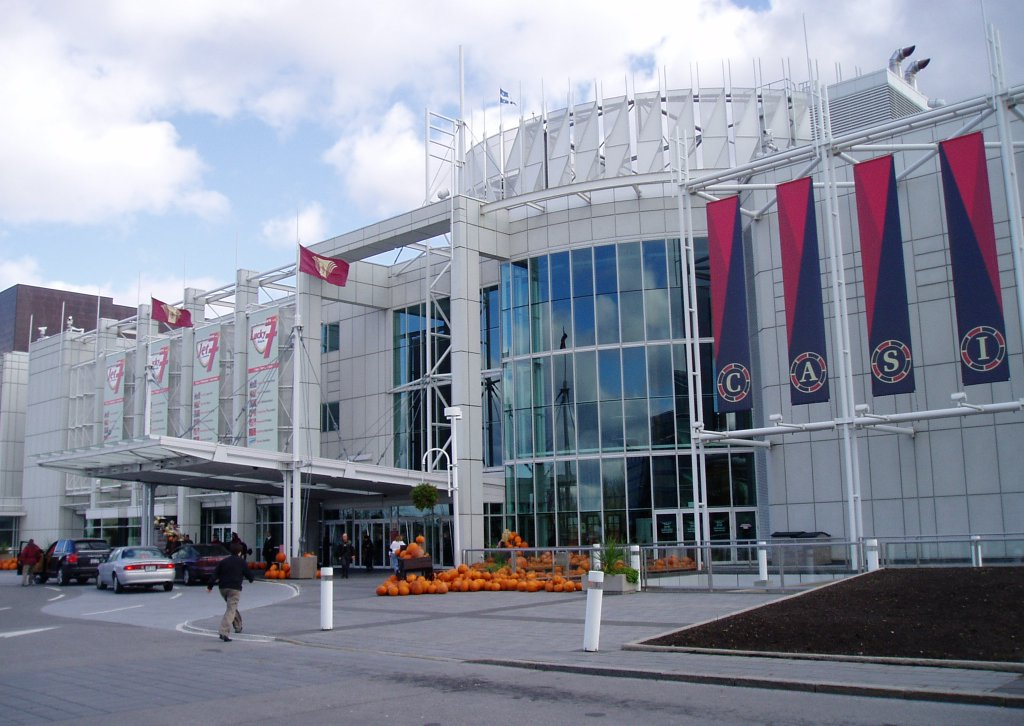
Casino du Lac-Leamy, October 2005

The Société des casinos du Québec is a subsidiary of Loto-Québec, a Quebec crown corporation. The Société des casinos du Québec oversees all four government-run casinos in the province of Quebec: the Casino de Montréal, the Casino du Lac-Leamy, the Casino de Mont-Tremblant, and the Casino de Charlevoix.

== History ==
In December 1992, the Quebec cabinet approved and authorized the construction of two government-run casinos: one on Île Notre-Dame, in Montreal, and the other at Pointe-au-Pic in the Charlevoix region.

The creation and management of these government-run casinos was entrusted to Loto-Québec, which subsequently created three subsidiaries: the Société des casinos du Québec Inc., given the responsibility of building the casinos and overseeing their operation, Resto-Casino Inc., which operates the restaurants and bars at the three casinos, and Casiloc Inc., which is in charge of acquiring, building and overseeing casino facilities.

The Casino de Montréal was inaugurated on October 9, 1993, and is located in the former French Pavilion (Pavillon de la France) of the 1967 World Exposition.

In 1994, the Casino de Charlevoix opened its doors in what was once the Manoir Richelieu's summer playhouse located at Pointe-au-Pic.

The Casino du Lac-Leamy was the first of Québec's casinos to be built from the ground up. It was inaugurated on March 24, 1996.

The Casino de Mont-Tremblant was inaugurated on June 24, 2009.

Prior to the opening of the Mont-Tremblant casino, Quebec's three other casinos welcomed some 10.5 million visitors each year.

== Mandate ==
The Société des casinos du Québec Inc. is entrusted with the mission of constructing and overseeing the management of Québec's casinos.

== Facts and Figures ==
- Number of jobs directly created: over 6,000
- Number of visits* per year: nearly 11 million
- Number of visits to the casinos by visitors from outside the province each year: 2.5 million
- Sales for 2005-2006: $758.5 million
- Earnings for 2005-2006: nearly $256 million

*Including all visits (by tourists and non-tourists)

- In 2005-2006, Québec's casinos generated $758.5 million in gaming revenues, 22% of which was from clients from outside the province, a clientele that directly generated an additional $66 million in economic spin-offs from other non-gaming sources.
- For its part, Resto-Casino posted total earnings of $100.9 million during 2005-2006.
