= Jean Dumontier =

Canadian-Québécois architect and artist

- Born: 23 June 1935; Rigaud
- Died: 27 December 2018 (aged 83)
- Occupation: Architect, artist
- Works: Jean-Drapeau station, Longueuil–Université-de-Sherbrooke station

Jean Dumontier (23 June 1935 – 27 December 2018) was a Canadian-Quebecois architect and artist. He is best known for having designed the Montreal Metro stations Jean-Drapeau (serving the Expo 67 site) and Longueuil–Université-de-Sherbrooke. He was also the first architect of the subway to have himself created the works of art for the stations of his own design, those being the four concrete walls of the dock of the station Jean-Drapeau.

== Biography ==
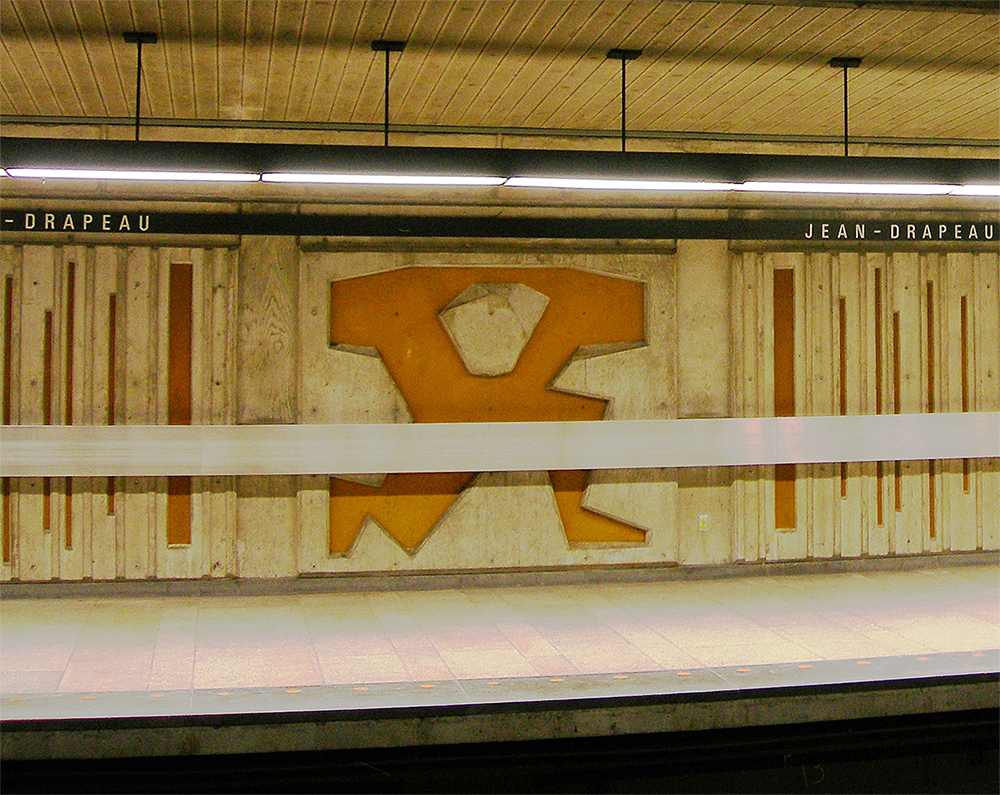
Painted concrete murals at Jean-Drapeau

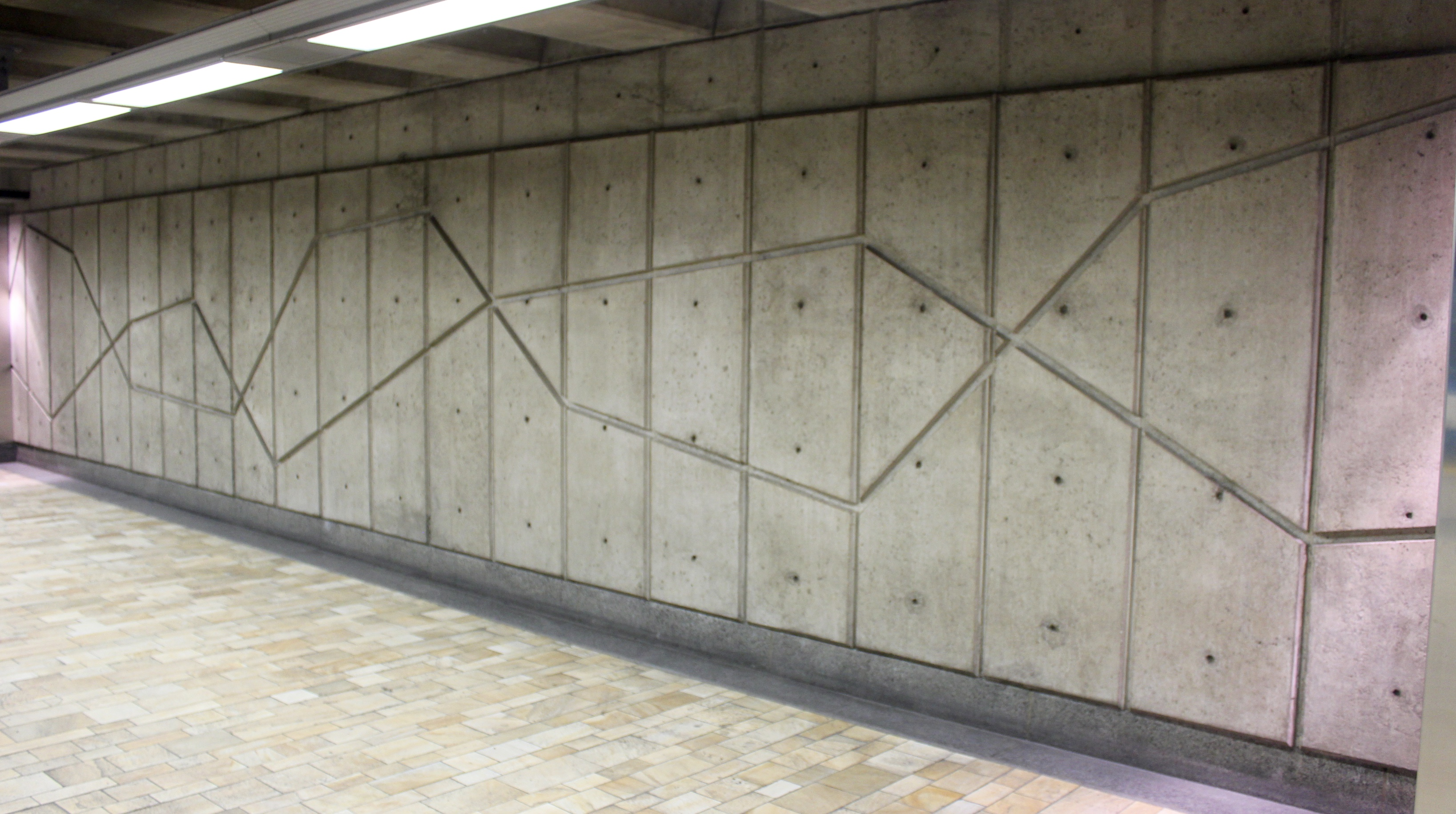
Concrete wall with asymmetrical lines at Longueuil

Born in Rigaud in 1935, Jean Dumontier was hired by the city of Montreal in the 1960s, joining the team of architects who developed the Montreal Metro in 1962. He was entrusted with the design of stations that would serve Expo 67, Île-Sainte-Hélène and Longueuil (today Jean-Drapeau and Longueuil-Université-de-Sherbrooke). He also created the murals of the Jean-Drapeau station, representing the Titan Atlas and recalling the theme of Expo 67, "Man and His World" (Terre des Hommes).

In 1967, at the age of 32, he became head of the metro design office and hired young architects of his generation. In the 1970s, he was appointed Superintendent of the Architecture Division at the Metropolitan Transportation Bureau (BTM), then became its director, overseeing the extension of the network in the 1970s and 1980s.

Throughout his career, he promoted the integration of works of art into the architecture of all stations, which makes the Montreal metro unique in the world. Several noted artists, such as Jean-Paul Mousseau, Michel de Broin, Marcelle Ferron, Charles Daudelin and Frédéric Bach, are represented by significant works in the Montreal underground.

Many cities around the world approached Dumontier to build, extend or modernize their transit system. Cities like Mexico City, Boston, New York City, Los Angeles, Washington D.C. and Atlanta have been inspired by the Montreal network in their own drives for redevelopment.

Jean Dumontier died of cancer on 27 December 2018, at the age of 83.

== See also ==
- Montreal Metro: Station design
