= Polytope de Montréal =

Media installation in Montreal, Quebec, Canada

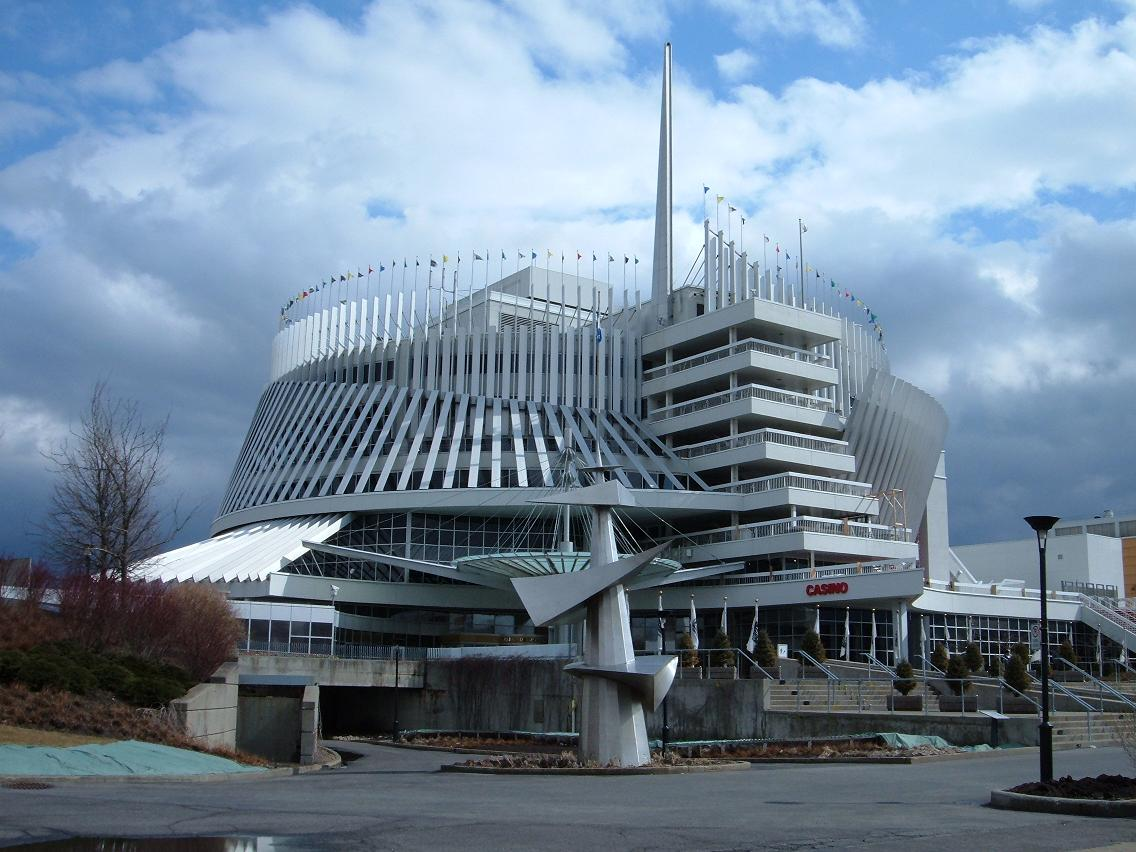
Casino de Montréal.

Polytope de Montréal was a media installation in the French Pavilion, which now houses the Montreal Casino. The installation included a sculpture, light show, and musical composition designed and composed by Iannis Xenakis for Expo 67, the 1967 International and Universal Exposition. The piece was the first of many such installations by Xenakis.

== Background ==
In 1966, Xenakis was commissioned to compose a work for the French Pavilion at the 1967 International and Universal Exposition in Montréal, known as Expo 67. The pavilion, designed by architect Jean Faugeron, was a multi-level structure consisting of exhibition halls surrounding a central open area. In response to the commission, Xenakis proposed the construction of a fully-automated multimedia "spectacle of sound and light," to be installed in the central space of the building. This would become Xenakis's first "polytope," a term derived from the Greek polys ("many") and topos ("place"), and would consist of a large metal sculpture housing a light show, plus a musical component.

== Sculpture and light show ==
In the building's central atrium, Xenakis erected a web of suspended steel cables that were interwoven in order to form five curved shapes or sails, stretching from the first floor to the ceiling six floors above. Attached to these cables were 1200 strobe lights, 800 of which were white, and 400 colored. The lights were individually controlled by a film which caused them to be triggered twenty-five times per second, allowing Xenakis to create a six-minute series of configurations that resulted in moving patterns and shapes, all characterized by a sense of visual continuity. The composer recalled: "I had a cloud of lights in space with which I could carry out the same operations as with clouds of sound."

== Music ==
In conjunction with the visual aspect of the work, Xenakis composed a six-minute piece for four identical ensembles, each composed of piccolo, E♭ clarinet, contrabass clarinet, contrabassoon, trumpet, trombone, percussion, violins, and cellos. The music, the composition of which overlapped with that of Xenakis's first spatial work Terretektorh, involved registrally-extreme glissando-based passages that were passed from one group to another, and was recorded in Paris by the Ensemble Ars Nova, conducted by Marius Constant. The score was later published by Boosey & Hawkes. The recording, in four channels, was intended to be projected into the central void of the pavilion via loudspeakers distributed throughout all the floors, allowing for the impression of movement through space.

== Overall effect ==
Once per hour, the pavilion's public address system was interrupted when the polytope was activated for a six-minute period, during which the public could move about the space as Xenakis's music was heard in accompaniment to the light show. (The regularity of these events caused them to become known as the "clock-tower" of the paviliion.) Regarding the connection between the music and the visual spectacle, Xenakis reflected:

We are capable of speaking two languages at the same time. One is addressed to the eyes, the other to the ears. The content of the communication is different but sometimes there's a link between the two. This is necessary because we're used to the fact that there's a connection between what we see and what we hear.

== Aftermath ==
The success of Polytope de Montréal convinced Xenakis that with better technology, more interesting results could be achieved, and led to the creation of a series of multimedia spectacles, including Hibiki Hana Ma, composed for the 1970 World Exposition in Osaka, and the Polytopes of Persepolis and Cluny (1971 and 1972). This period also saw a change in Xenakis's standing in the world of music, with the appearance of festivals dedicated to his music.
