= Guy Coulombe =

- Born: June 15, 1936; Quebec City, Quebec, Canada
- Died: June 22, 2011 (aged 75)
- Awards: National Order of Quebec

Guy Coulombe, GOQ (June 15, 1936 – June 22, 2011) was a senior public servant in the Canadian province of Quebec. At various times the leader of Hydro-Quebec and the Sûreté du Québec and the general manager of Montreal, Coulombe was described as Quebec's "go-to mandarin on tough issues."

== Early life ==
Coulombe was born to an upper-middle-class family in Quebec City. He earned a Bachelor of Science degree and a master's degree in sociology from the Université Laval and later entered a Ph.D. program in economic development at the University of Chicago. He returned to Quebec City without completing his degree to enter the public service in the early years of Quebec's Quiet Revolution.

== Public servant ==
Early years

Coulombe became a Quebec public servant in 1963 as a member of the Bureau d'aménagement de l'Est de Québec. From 1966 to 1969, he was director of planning at the Office de planification et de développement du Québec. He briefly entered the Canadian federal civil service in 1969 as assistant deputy minister of supply and services, but returned to Quebec in 1970 to become assistant secretary of the province's treasury board. In 1973, he was promoted to secretary.

In 1975, Coulombe was appointed by Quebec premier Robert Bourassa to become secretary-general of the Executive Council of Quebec (i.e., the provincial cabinet). He was retained in this position after Parti Québécois leader René Lévesque succeeded Bourassa as premier in 1976. Two years later, he was named as president and chief executive officer of the Société générale de financement du Québec. He oversaw a restructuring of the organization and announced that it had made a $9.5 million profit for 1979, compared with losses of $14.4 million the previous year. In 1980, he announced that his agency would invest $1.2 billion in Quebec businesses over the next five years.

Coulumbe was appointed as a representative of Quebec government agencies on the board of Domtar in 1981. In December of the same year, he oversaw the sale of a thirty-five per cent equity interest in Marine Industries Ltd. of Sorel to the French firm Alsthom-Atlantique.

Hydro-Quebec

René Lévesque appointed Coulombe as president and chief executive officer of Hydro-Quebec in late 1981, with a term beginning on January 15, 1982. In September 1982, Coulombe introduced a significant restructuring program for Hydro-Quebec's upper management. He released a revised capital spending program shortly thereafter, indicating that the agency would avoid significant new projects over the next five to six years due to a recession and reduced demand. Hydro-Quebec posted a forty-three per cent profit increase for 1982, despite a drop in consumption. Coulombe introduced another revised plan in 1983 that further downgraded capital spending in light of ongoing difficulties selling surplus energy to neighbouring markets.

In mid-1985, Coulombe criticized a plan by Robert Bourassa (then the leader of the opposition in the Quebec legislature) to export twelve thousand megawatts of power to the United States of America. Although Coulombe also favoured increased sales to the United States, he argued that Bourassa's strategy could lock Quebec into unfavourable rates and was too risky in the long term. After Bourassa became premier again in late 1985, Coulombe indicated that Hydro-Quebec could be confident of exporting 3,500 to 4,500 megawatts of power by the mid-1990s. He also indicated that it had a plan for exports almost as large as those preferred by Bourassa if "economic growth [in neighbouring markets] exceeds present predictions."

Coulombe oversaw a major deal in late 1985 to export up to 2,300 megawatts of Quebec's energy to New England utilities. The following year, he announced that Hydro-Quebec would invest between twenty and twenty-seven billion dollars to construct new dams and transmission lines over the next decade, mostly to export energy to the United States. In early 1987, he helped conclude a deal for Quebec to export up to one thousand megawatts of power to Maine by 2020. The latter deal was valued at fifteen billion dollars.

Coulombe left Hydro-Quebec in April 1988, at around the same time that Premier Bourassa introduced his plans for the massive Great Whale Hydro Project in northern Quebec to provide energy for New York State. Rumours had previously circulated that Coulombe was unhappy working under Bourassa.

Subsequent career

Coulombe was appointed by the government of Canada to the Canadian National Railway board of governors in June 1988. He also served a brief term as president and chief operating officer of Consolidated-Bathurst Inc. in the late 1980s, in which capacity he advocated a merger with Domtar. He resigned after Consolidated was sold to Chicago entrepreneur Roger Stone.

Coulombe was appointed as president of the Quebec-Canada Television Consortium (CTQC) in April 1991, and in July 1992 he was appointed to a three-year term on the board of Atomic Energy of Canada Limited. He was the Quebec government's chief negotiator in land claims negotiations with the Atikamekw and Montagnais First Nations in the same period.

Sûreté du Québec

In November 1996, Coulombe was appointed as interim director of the Sûreté du Québec (SQ), the provincial police force. He was the first civilian to oversee the SQ or its predecessor organizations in the force's 127-year history; the SQ had previously been implicated in a serious corruption scandal, and Coulombe's appointment coincided with the launch of a public inquiry into its activities. One journalist wrote that the Quebec government had "effectively placed the Sûreté in trusteeship" through his appointment.

Coulombe introduced a series of reforms in August 1997 that he said would make the SQ "become again a great police force." His one hundred page plan included requirements that investigators file daily reports and videotape interrogations, the hiring of in-house lawyers to advise investigators, better screening for promotions and preference for educated candidates, and structural adjustments for rural divisions. Coulombe acknowledged that some officers might be reluctant to accept the changes, saying "It's a matter of culture and attitude really... There's no magic wand. If the investigators feel confident, if they are well supervised, then they'll move ahead."

Coulombe was confirmed as the SQ's director in May, after eighteen months of holding the position on an interim basis. He left the position in November of the same year.

Montreal administrator and after

Coulombe was appointed as city manager for Montreal in late 1999 and served until early 2003. Considered close to Quebec premier Lucien Bouchard, Coulombe helped ensure the amalgamation of Montreal with its suburban communities on a strong central governance model.

In 2004, Coulombe was appointed by the Quebec government to chair a commission on the management of the province's public forests. The commission concluded that the forests were over-harvested, recommended a 20 per cent cut in production, and argued for a more ecologically sound and decentralized approach. The Quebec government subsequently introduced sector cuts slightly larger than those recommended by Coulombe.

Coulombe later chaired an advisory panel that examined a proposal by Loto-Quebec and Cirque du Soleil to establish a casino in Montreal. The panel concluded in March 2006 that the plan "deserve[d] consideration, because of its positive impact on the city of Montreal's economic and urban development" but added that a final decision would be "premature" and recommended further study. Cirque du Soleil announced the following day that it would abandon the plan, citing uncertainty as to a final decision.

In late 2006, Coulombe was appointed as a mediator between the Quebec government and the province's medical specialists in a dispute over pay and working conditions. The two sides reached an agreement in September 2007.

Coulombe recommended in 2010 that Quebec introduce a centralized bidding procedure for municipal contacts with a centralized computer registry. This was intended to reduce the possibility of corrupt practices.

Coulombe was named to the Order of Quebec in June 2007. The following year, Luc Bernier contributed a chapter entitled, "Leadership and Province Building: Guy Coulombe in Quebec" to book, Searching for leadership: secretaries to cabinet in Canada. Bernier credited Coulombe with "institut[ing] order in chaotic organizational structures."

== Death ==
Coulombe died of lung cancer on June 22, 2011.
