= Québec Pavilion =

Exhibit of the 1967 World's Fair in Montreal

Coordinates: 45.505°N 73.526°W

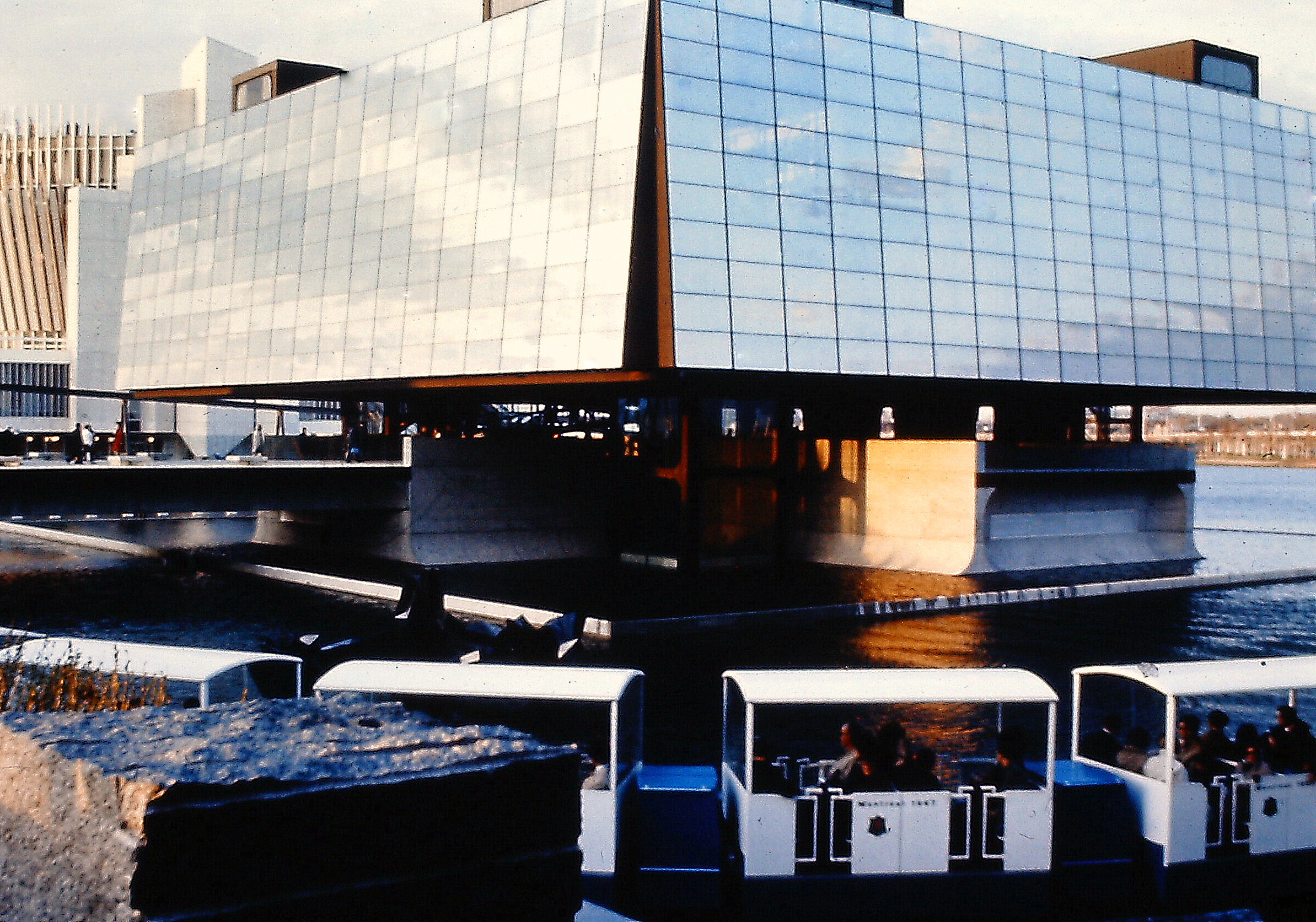
The Québec Pavilion in 1967

The Québec Pavilion was one of the exhibits at Expo 67 on Notre Dame Island in Montreal.

== Overview ==
The Québec Pavilion's architecture emphasized simple, rectilinear forms. Its exterior walls were made of glass, appearing as large rectangular mirrors during the day and becoming an illuminated display case at night. The structure was accessible by a footbridge.

The pavilion's modern design and exhibits contrasted with the prevailing public image of Quebec as a traditional society. Focused on urbanization, industrialization, business, and education, the displays positioned the province as forward-looking. Natural resources, forestry, and water were also presented as growth industries. The minimalist display methods were used to reflect contemporary changes in Quebec society.

== Architecture and exhibition design ==
The Québec Pavilion adopted a minimalist architectural approach, with a simple structural frame and open interior spaces. The construction, led by Montreal architects Papineau Gérin-Lajoie Le Blanc and Luc Durand, was composed of concrete floors and Vierendeel steel trusses supported by four steel towers.

The design of the Québec Pavilion's exhibition was done by the Swiss designer Gustave Maeder. The exhibition themes were incorporated into the pavilion's architecture through a system of cubic display modules. The cubes were used both as display cases for objects and as sculptural elements that formed part of the exhibits themselves. The exhibition explored three themes—Man's Challenge, Man's Struggle and Drive—which presented an interpretation of Quebec society moving toward an urban and industrial future. The 4,200 x 24 inch (60 cm) sided steel cubes took on different shapes. The theme of Challenge was experienced by the visitors as they were taken up the cylindrical elevators up to the mezzanine floor. From the mezzanine, visitors got an overview of the theme of Struggle by walking the downward ramp. In clockwise order, the visitors saw representations of Quebec's Conquest of nature; its Water, Forest, Earth, and Underground which would subsequently be transformed by Industry. On the ground floor, visitors encountered displays depicting contemporary life in Montreal. At the end of the route, visitors reached the central area devoted to the theme Drive, which focused on the province's future development.

== Recognition ==
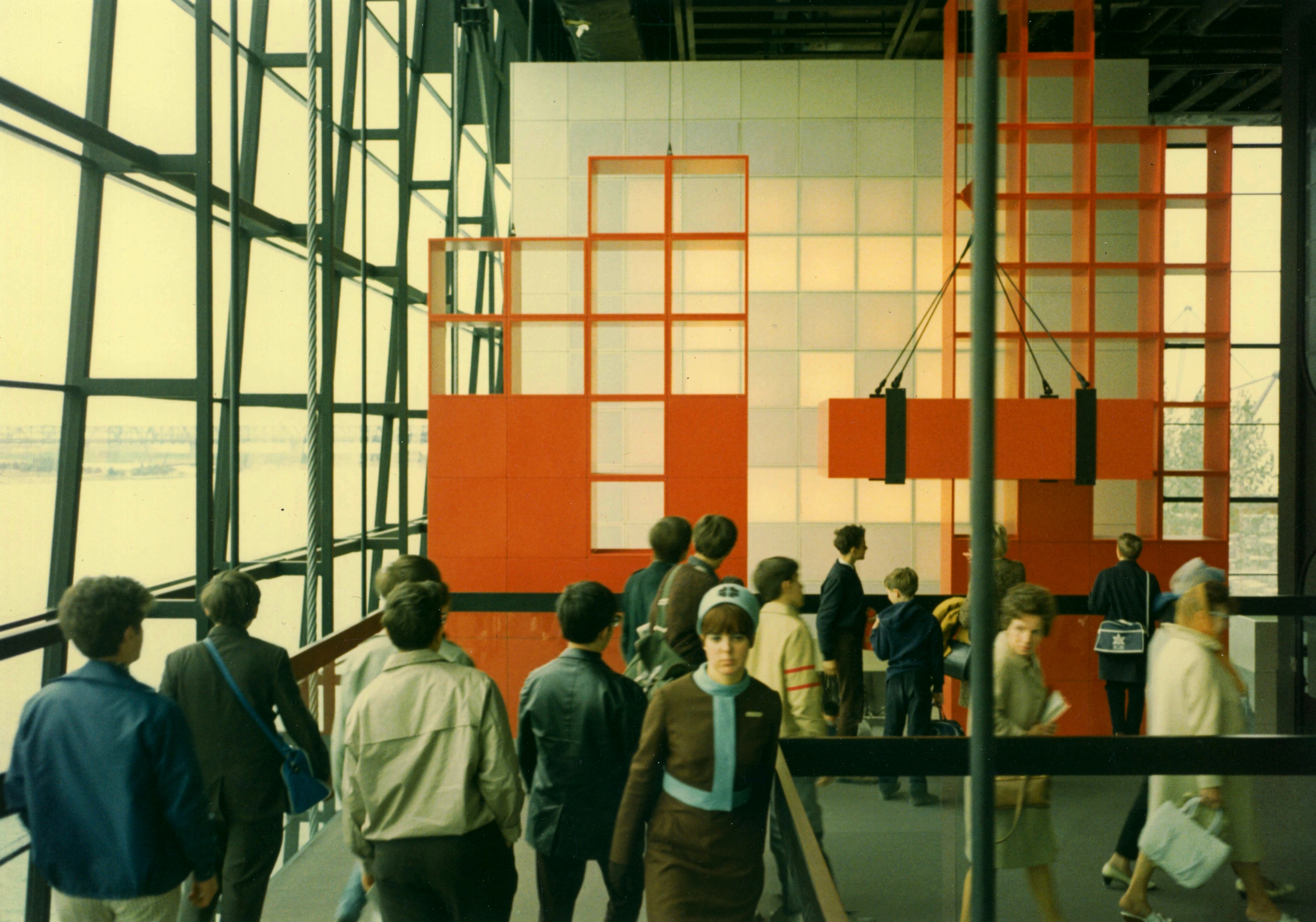
The Quebec Pavilion Exhibition in 1967

Visiting Montreal in April 1967, Ada Louise Huxtable, a New York Times architecture critic, praised the Québec Pavilion, calling it the Barcelona Pavilion of Expo 67:

"Quebec is the Barcelona Pavilion of 1967... [The Quebec Pavilion] combines an exceptionally refined work of contemporary architecture with an exhibition design that is a three-dimensional sensory abstraction of sight and electronic sound that says, suddenly, and stunningly, what a 1967 exhibit should be."

Toronto Star's Robert Fulford called it:

"Cool and restrained and sophisticated…Rarely can there ever have been a large exhibition so pure, so rarified as this one… The severe spirit of Mondrian fills the Quebec Pavilion".

== Gallery ==
Photos from the Quebec Pavilion's exhibition at Expo 67
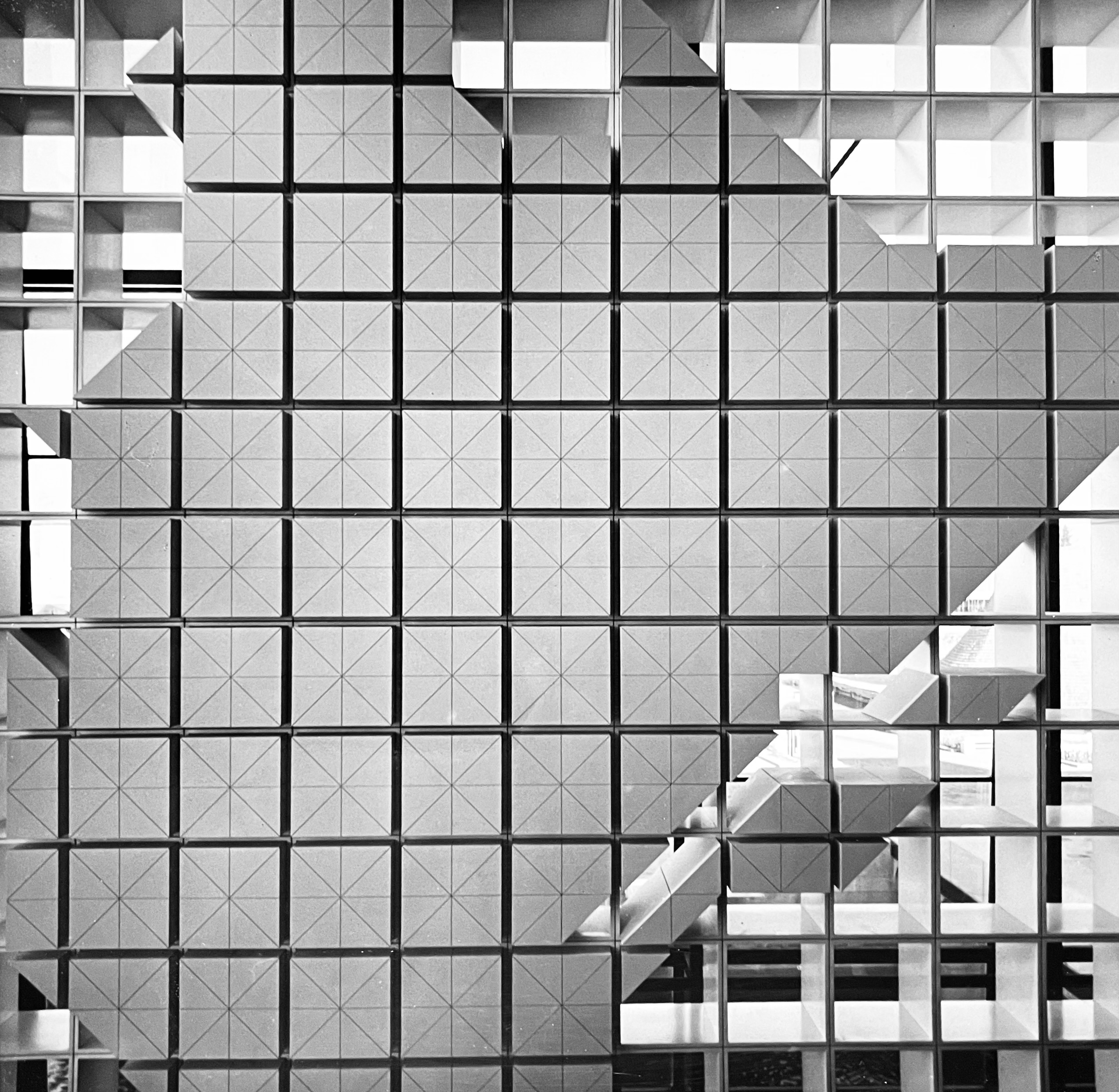
Filled cubes on a grid representing the map of the province of Quebec in the Challenge sector

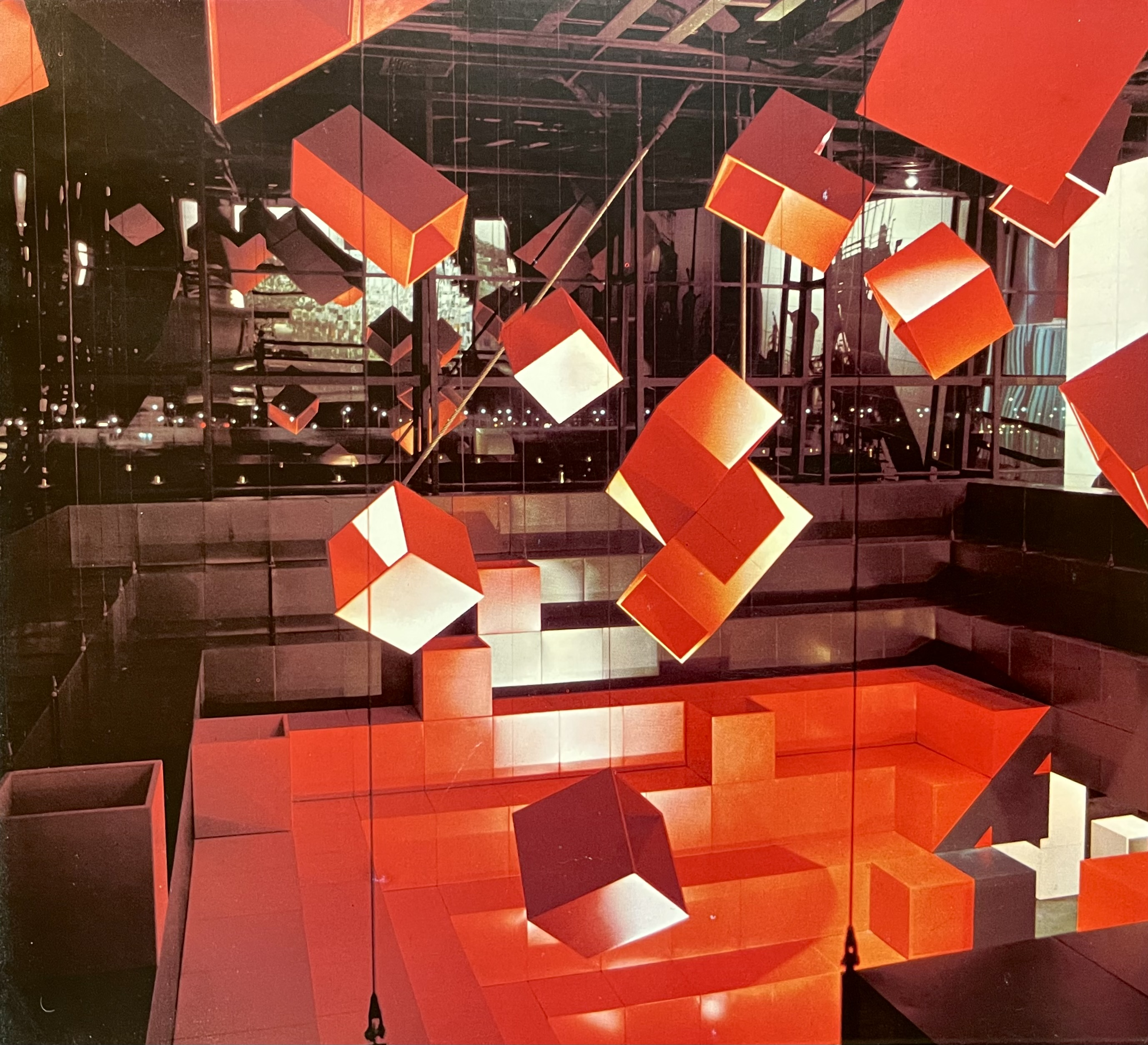
Blast in an open sky mine in the Struggle sector

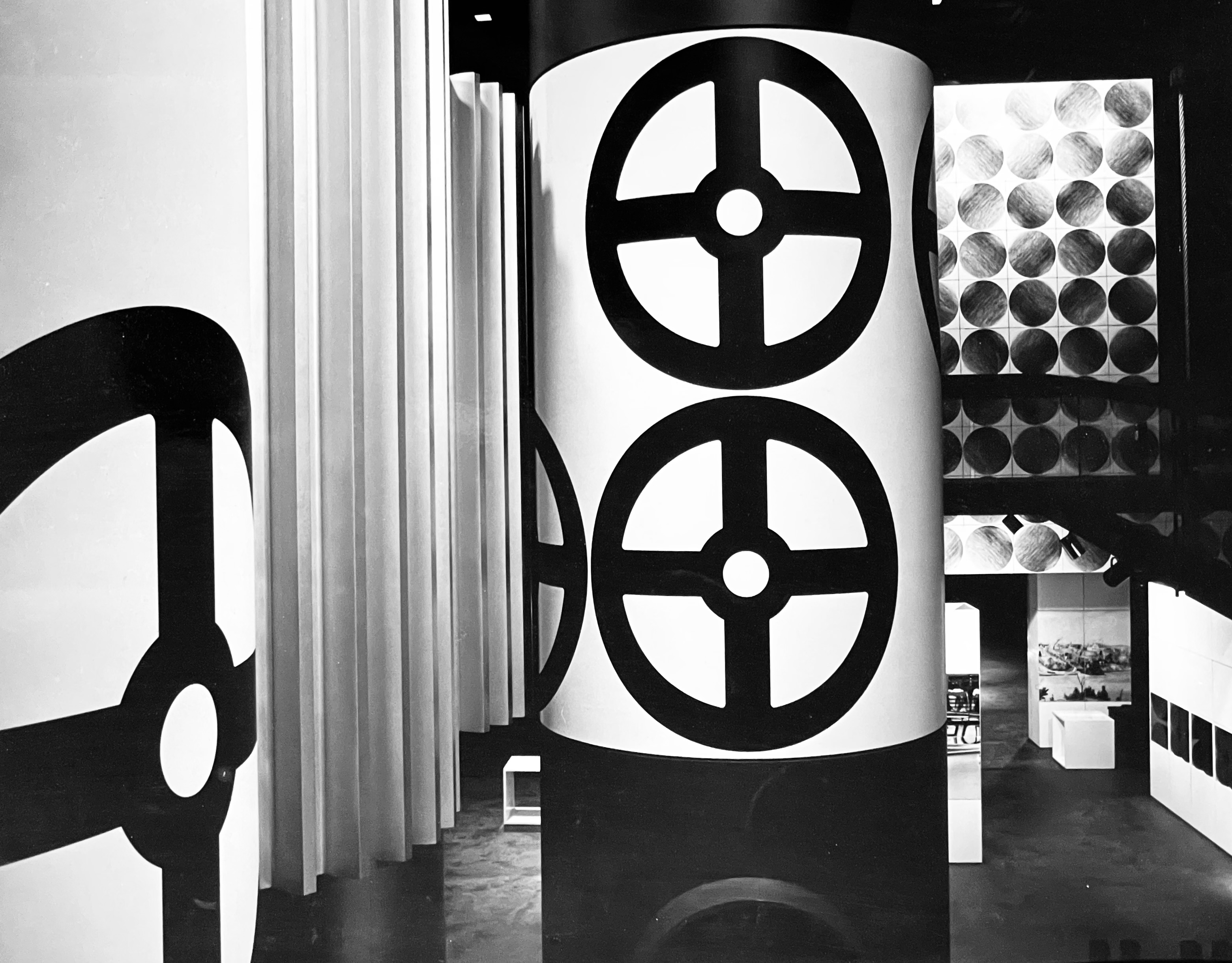
Turbines representing the pulp industry in the Struggle sector

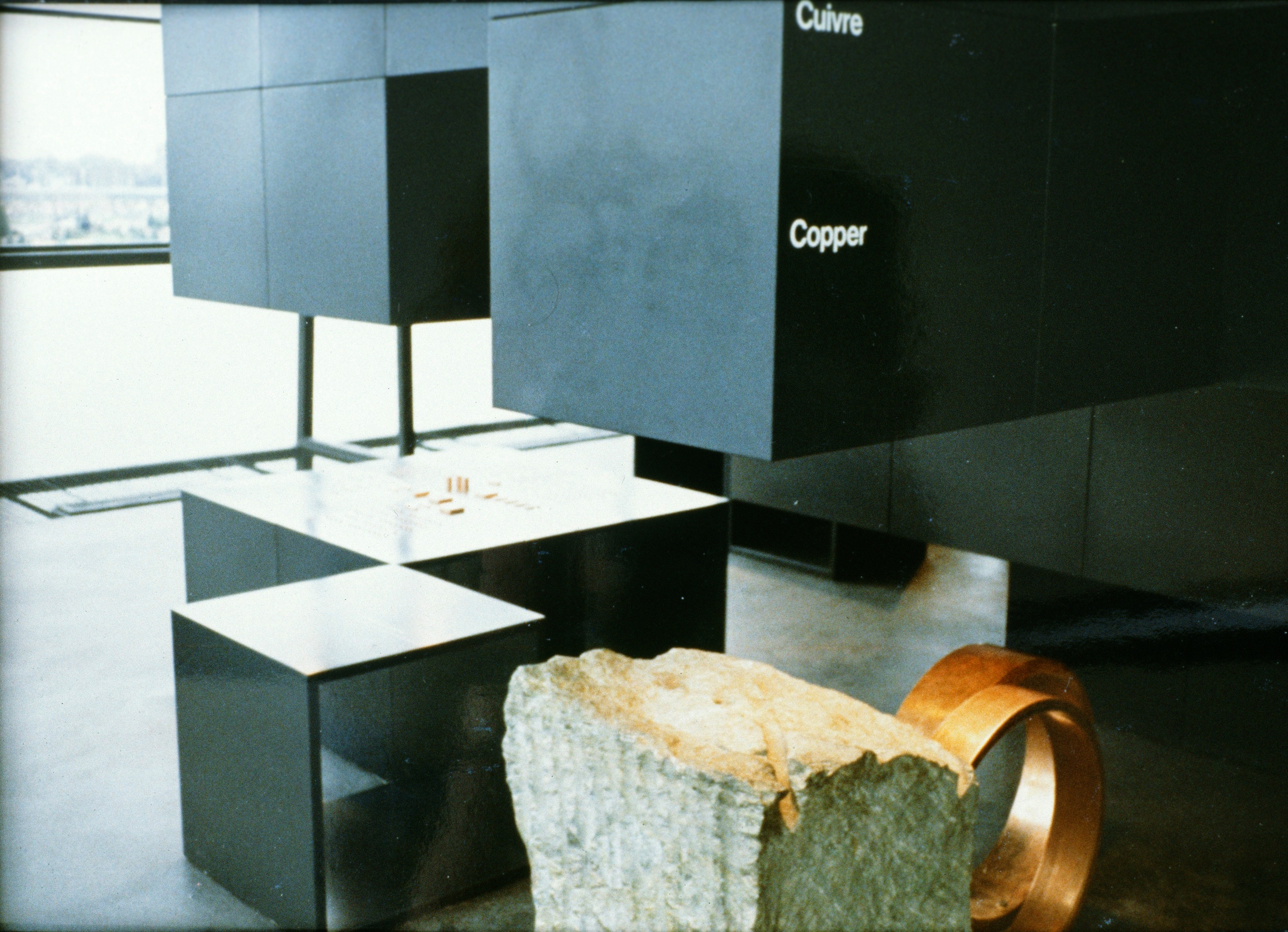
Copper rock and machine shopped parts in the Struggle sector

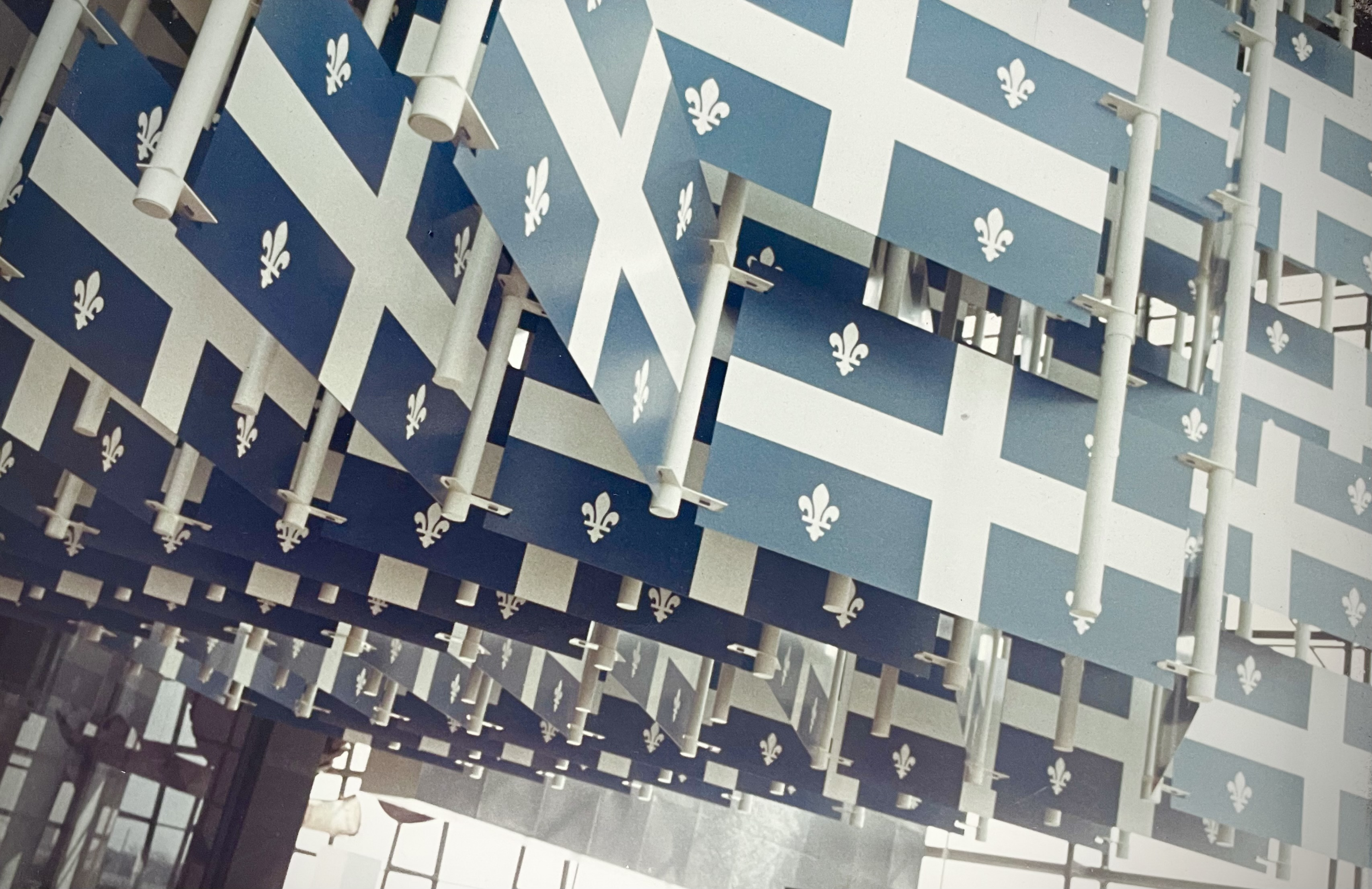
Quebec flags representing the province's political aspirations in the Drive sector

== Later use ==
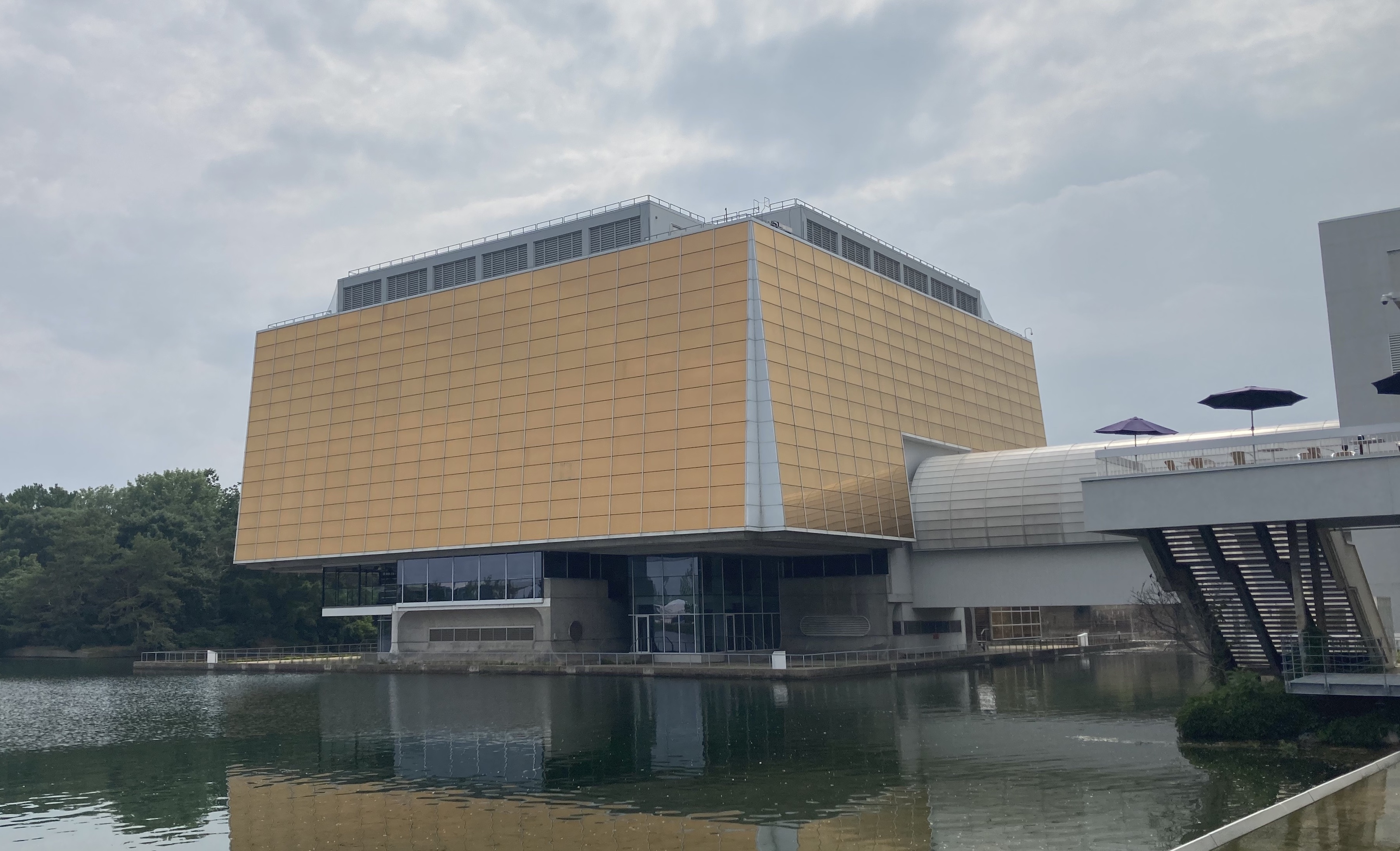
The Québec Pavilion in 2023, as part of the Montreal Casino

The building and the adjacent French pavilion are now part of the Montreal Casino, the largest in Canada.

== Bibliography ==
- Lownsbrough, John (2012). The History of Canada Series: The Best Place To Be: Expo '67 And Its Time, Penguin Canada, ISBN 9780143184010
- Hénault, Odile (2016). Architects of the Quiet Revolution , Canadian Architect.
