= Jean-Drapeau station =

Montreal Metro station

Jean-Drapeau
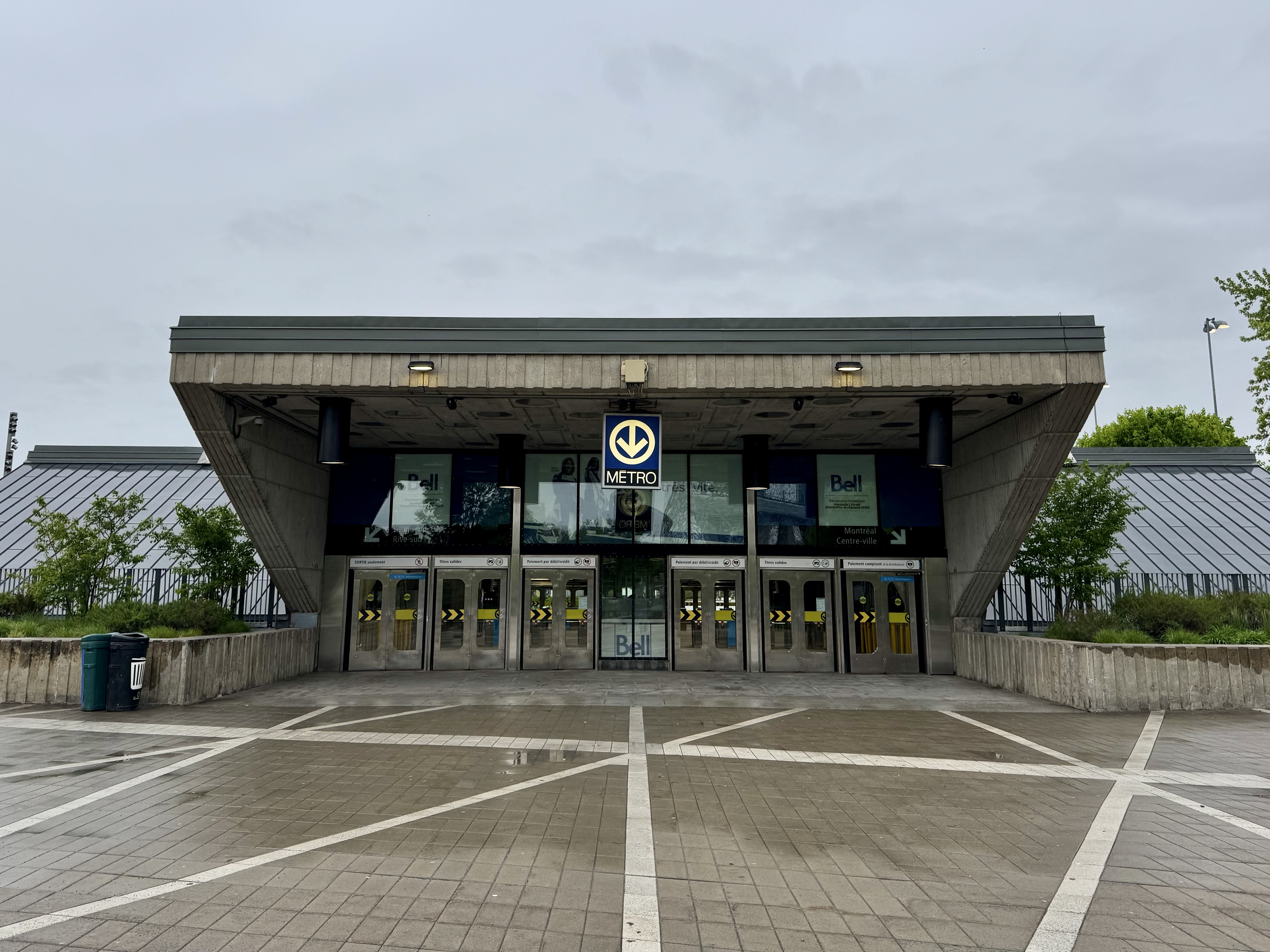
- Entrance to Jean-Drapeau station

General information
- Location: 170 rue Ste-Hélène; Montreal, Quebec; Canada
- Coordinates: 45°30′45″N 73°31′59″W
- Operator: Société de transport de Montréal
- Platforms: 2 side platforms
- Tracks: 2
- Connections: STM bus

Construction
- Depth: 4.6 metres (15 feet 1 inch), 60th deepest
- Accessible: Yes (no other accessible stations on Yellow Line)
- Architect: Jean Dumontier

Other information
- Fare zone: ARTM: A

History
- Opened: 1 April 1967

Passengers
- 2024: 1,706,359 ▲13.4%
- Rank: 54 of 68

Services
| Preceding station | Montreal Metro | Following station |
|---|---|---|
| Berri–UQAM Terminus | Yellow Line | Longueuil Terminus |
Location

Jean-Drapeau station is a Montreal Metro station in Montreal, Quebec, Canada. It is operated by the Société de transport de Montréal (STM) and serves the Yellow Line. It is situated on the Saint Helen's Island in the Saint Lawrence River.

== Overview ==
The station's platform

The station was constructed in open cut as part of the enlargement of Saint Helen's Island to host Expo 67. The official opening of the station took place on April 1, 1967. In the first four weeks, it served only the construction workers of the Expo site. Île Sainte-Hélène station finally opened to the public on April 28, 1967, the day after the official opening of Expo 67.

The station was designed to handle large crowds, with a side platform design and large staircases to a ground level concourse. During Expo 67, the station handled over 60,000 passengers every hour.

The station now serves the various attractions on Saint Helen's Island and Notre Dame Island – including Jean-Drapeau Park, the La Ronde amusement park and the Montreal Casino, as well as events like the Canadian Grand Prix at Circuit Gilles Villeneuve. This station was the least busy in the network in 2020 and 2021, with the COVID-19 pandemic closing and later reducing the capacity of most of these points of interest.

In May 2001, (Note: The decision to rename the station was taken in May 2000; the station name was changed in May 2001.) the station was renamed Jean-Drapeau after Jean Drapeau, mayor of Montreal from 1954 to 1957 and 1960 to 1986, who is often given credit for the construction of the Metro, and for securing both Expo 67 and the 1976 Summer Olympics. The park in which the station sits had been renamed Parc Jean-Drapeau in 1999.

=== Accessibility ===
The station was made accessible in November 2019 with the construction of two elevators. Despite being one of the lesser used stations on the network, elevators were installed due to low technical complexity and low cost of installation. As of 2022, none of the other stations on the Yellow line are accessible. This effectively negates the elevator’s purpose. However, construction work is currently underway at Berri–UQAM to allow accessible access to the Yellow line platforms, and in turn, the rest of the system.

=== Artwork ===
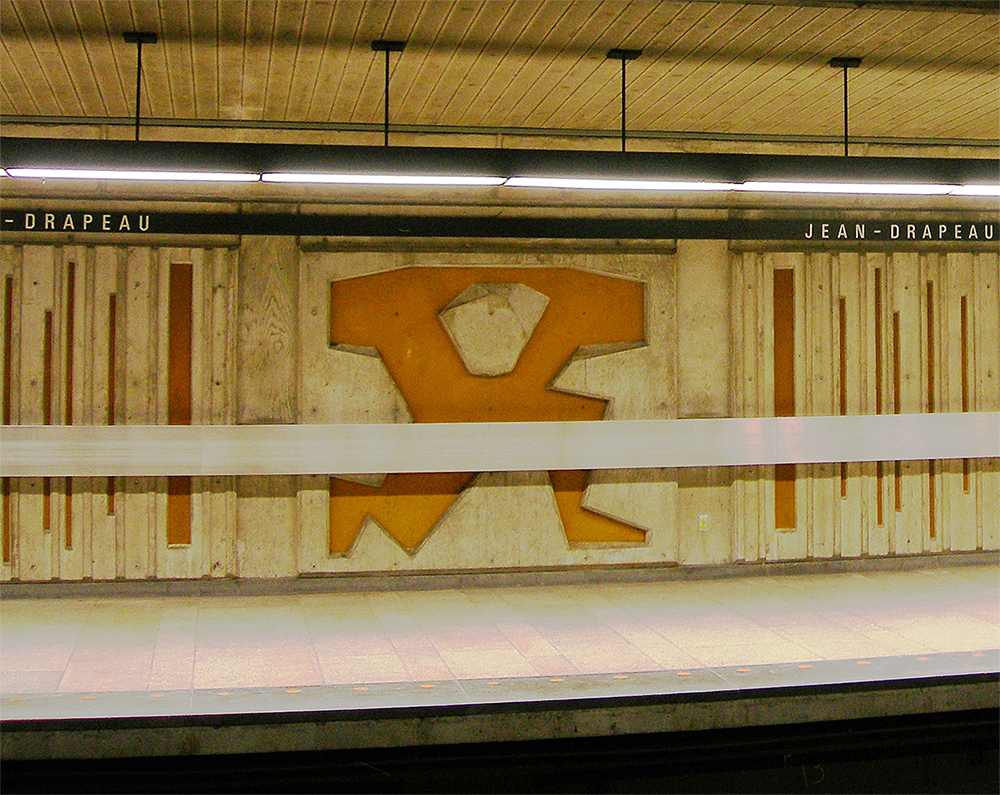
Mural by Jean Dumontier

Painted concrete murals by the station architect Jean Dumontier depict the mythological Titan Atlas holding up the roof of the station. Dumontier was the first architect of the metro to create his own artworks for stations of his own design.

In 1997, the operator of the Lisbon Metro gifted a granite sculpture by Portuguese artist João Charters de Almeida to the STM, to commemorate 30 years since the opening of the Montreal Metro and Expo 67, as well as the Portuguese community in the city. However, the 19 m (62 ft 4 in) high artwork was too large for any metro station. The artwork was installed instead in Parc Jean-Drapeau, located close to the station on Île Sainte-Hélène.

== Connecting bus routes ==
Société de transport de Montréal
| No. | Route | Connects to | Service times / notes |
|---|---|---|---|
| 292 | Parc Jean-Drapeau | | In service from Monday to Sunday all day, from the day after Labour Day in September to the day before Quebec's Fête nationale in June of the following year, except on public holidays Monday to Sunday From 6 a.m. to 7:15 p.m. |
| 767 | La Ronde / Station Jean-Drapeau | | Summer weekends only, serves La Ronde |
| 768 | Jean-Doré Beach | | Seasonal (summer only) |
| 777 | Station Jean-Drapeau / Casino / Bonaventure | Bonaventure; Gare Centrale; Terminus Centre-ville | Daily |

== Nearby points of interest ==
- Montreal Biosphere
- Montreal Casino
- Circuit Gilles Villeneuve
- La Ronde (Amusement Park)
- Jean-Drapeau Park
- Fort de l'Île Sainte-Hélène
- Notre-Dame Island
