= Notre Dame Island =

Artificial island near Montreal, Quebec, Canada

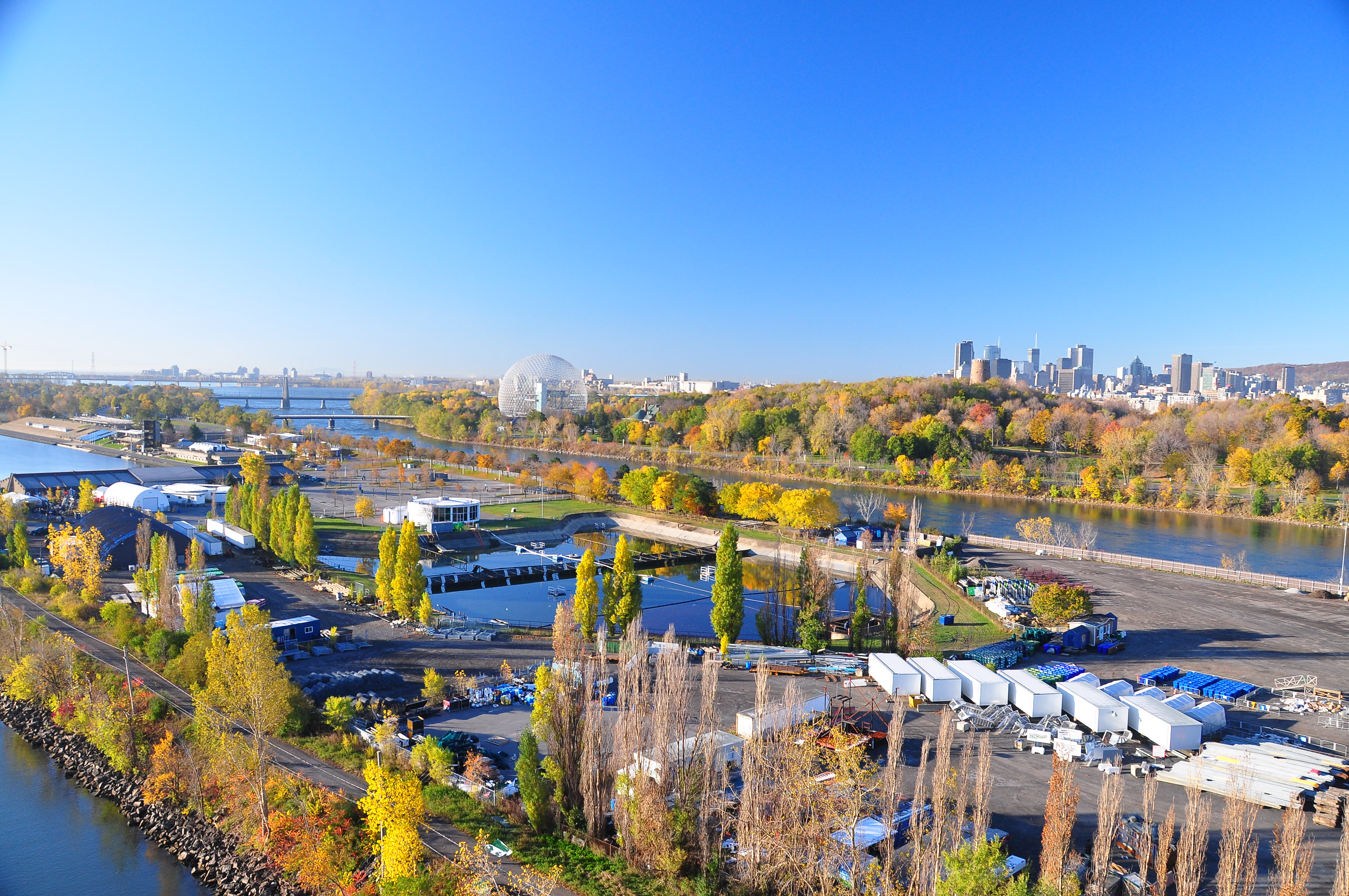

- Location within Montreal

Geography
- Location: Saint Lawrence River
- Coordinates: 45°30′15″N 73°31′35″W

Administration
- Canada
- Province: Quebec
- City: Montreal
- Borough: Ville-Marie

Demographics
- Population: 0

Notre Dame Island (French: Île Notre-Dame) is an artificial island in the Saint Lawrence River in Montreal, Quebec, Canada. It is immediately to the east of Saint Helen's Island and west of the Saint Lawrence Seaway and the city of Saint-Lambert on the south shore. Together with Saint Helen's Island, it makes up Parc Jean-Drapeau, which forms part of the Hochelaga Archipelago. To the southeast, the island is connected to the embankment separating the seaway and Lachine Rapids.

Parc Jean-Drapeau is registered as a leg of the Route Verte and Trans Canada Trail. The island contains the Circuit Gilles Villeneuve, which hosts the Formula One Canadian Grand Prix.

== History ==
Notre Dame Island was built in ten months from 15 million tons of rock excavated for the Montreal Metro in the early 1960s. It was created for Expo 67 to celebrate Canada's centennial.

Nearly all of the remaining Expo 67 pavilions were demolished in 1975 to make way for a long rowing and canoeing basin for Montreal's 1976 Summer Olympics. The Olympic Basin is still North America's largest artificial rowing basin. The former pavilion of France and the pavillon of Quebec was gutted, redecorated, and became the Montreal Casino, as a large gambling establishment owned and operated by the Government of Quebec. The Canadian Pavilion now serves the administration of the Société du parc Jean-Drapeau, a para-municipal body of the city of Montreal, manager of Parc Jean-Drapeau.

The park area on the island's southern tip has a small lake with a beach open throughout the summer for swimming, volleyball and watercraft rentals. During the decades since Expo 67, the city of Montreal has embellished the island with plants and trees, making it look less artificial.

In 1978, Circuit Île Notre-Dame was opened, which uses the roads of the island for motorsport events in the summer months. The circuit was renamed in 1982 after Canadian Formula One driver Gilles Villeneuve following his death earlier that year.

In 1980, the greening and beautification of the island was accelerated when it was the host to the Floralies Internationales, a horticultural exhibition and competition gathering plant masterpieces from dozens of countries. Still accessible today from spring to autumn, these gardens cover over 25 hectares (62 acres). The Floralies gardens are preserved and arranged creatively by the Parc Jean-Drapeau team of gardeners. In addition, the micro-climate created in part by the lagoons crisscrossing the island promotes the uniqueness of these gardens by allowing plants usually intolerant of Montreal's cold climate to grow.

The park hosted the ICF Canoe Sprint World Championships in 1986.

== Off-season ==
In fall and spring, visitors to Notre Dame Island primarily consist of gamblers at the casino and rowers and canoers at the Olympic Basin. During the coldest part of winter, ice skaters use the basin as a rink. City workers clear the snow from its icy surface as part of the annual winter festival, "La Fête des Neiges de Montréal". However, the ice rink was located on Saint Helen's Island, close to the Jean-Drapeau metro station, the past few years. Cross-country skiers and snowshoers can also tour the area.

== Circuit Gilles Villeneuve ==
Each summer, Notre-Dame Island's Circuit Gilles Villeneuve hosts the Formula One Canadian Grand Prix race and used to host the NAPA Auto Parts 200 of NASCAR's Nationwide Series (now known as the O'Reilly Auto Parts Series). The circuit is accessible to the public when it is not being used for motorsports for walking, running, biking, in-line skating, and driving.

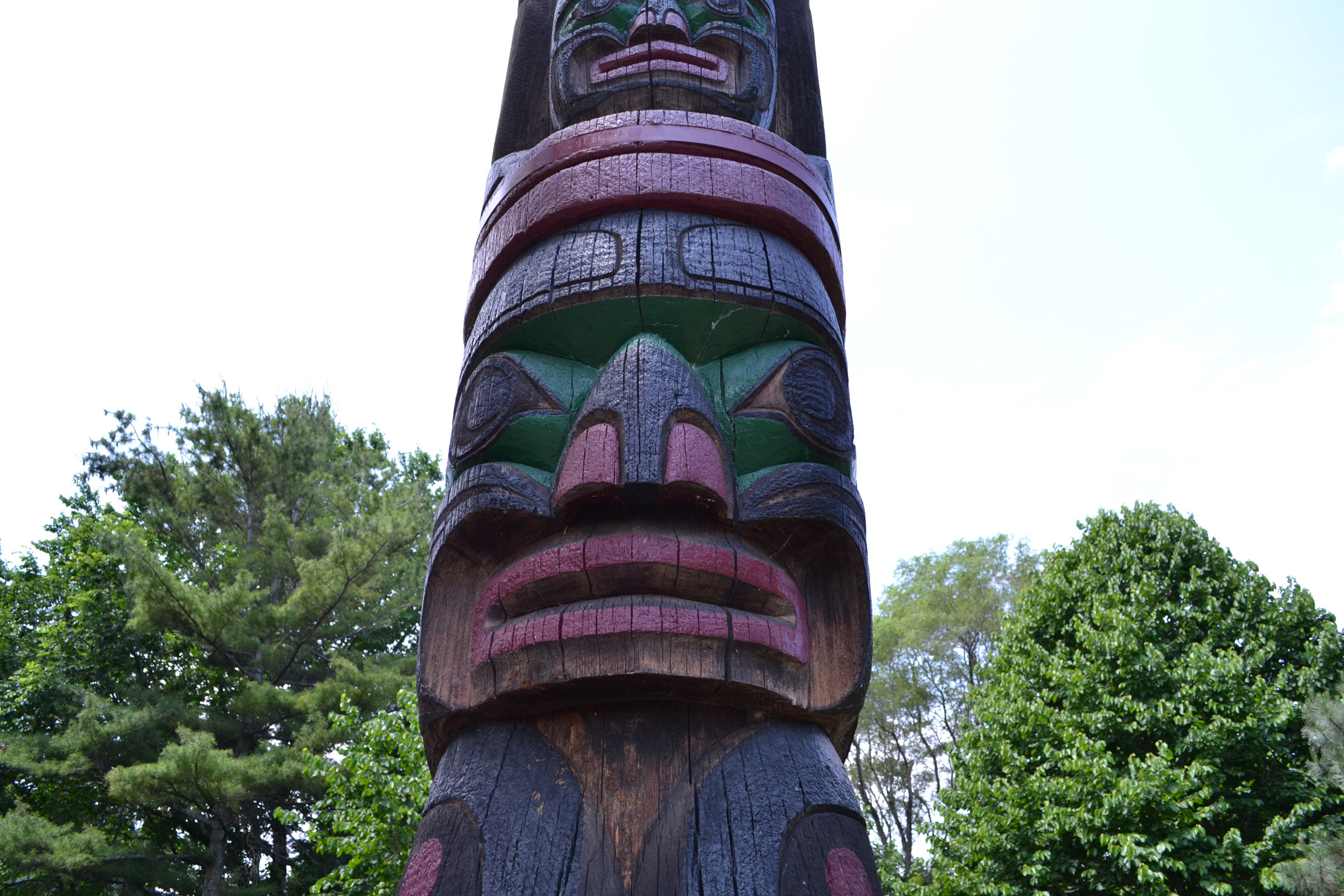
Kwakiutl Totem pole

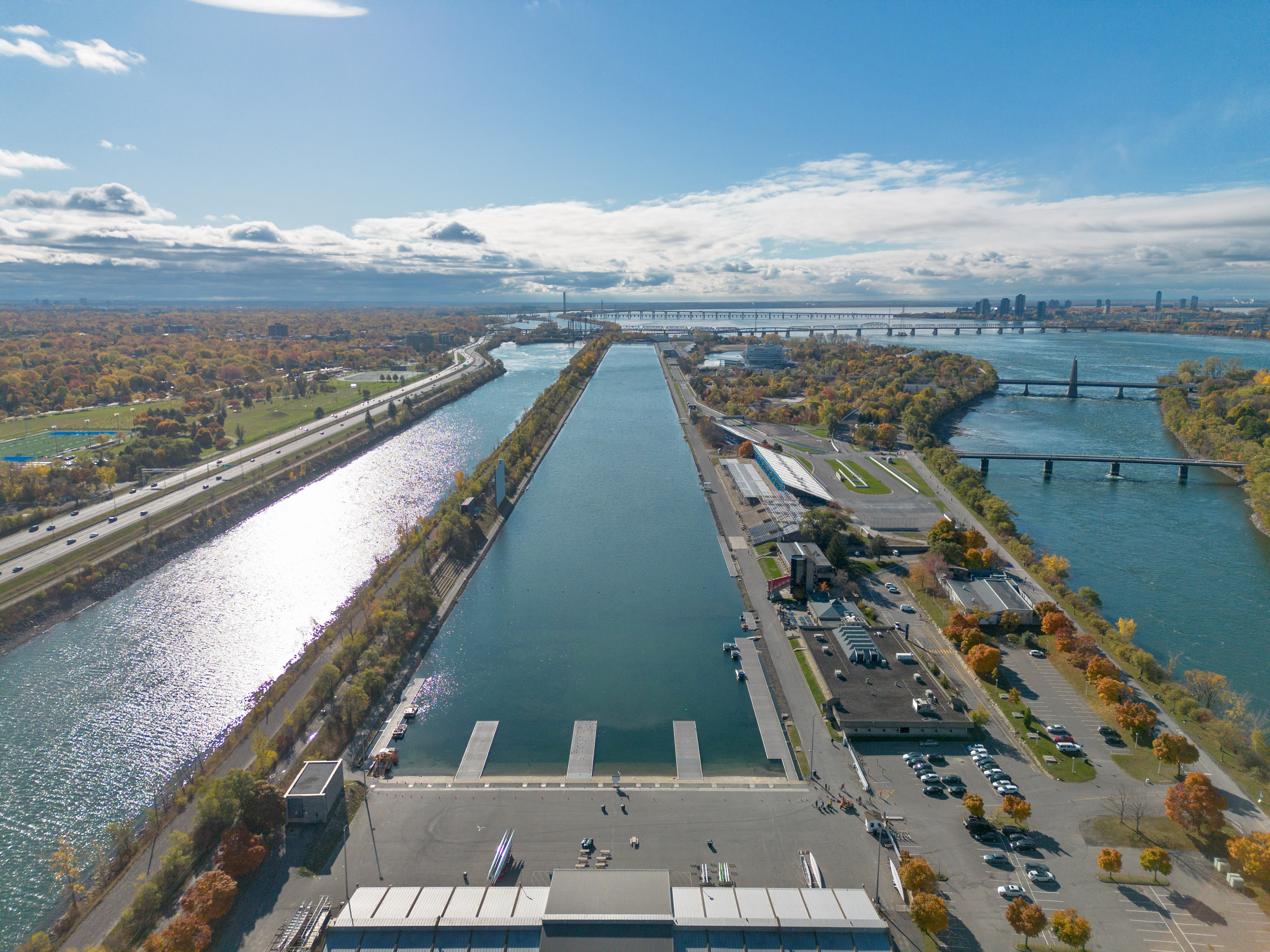
The Olympic Basin

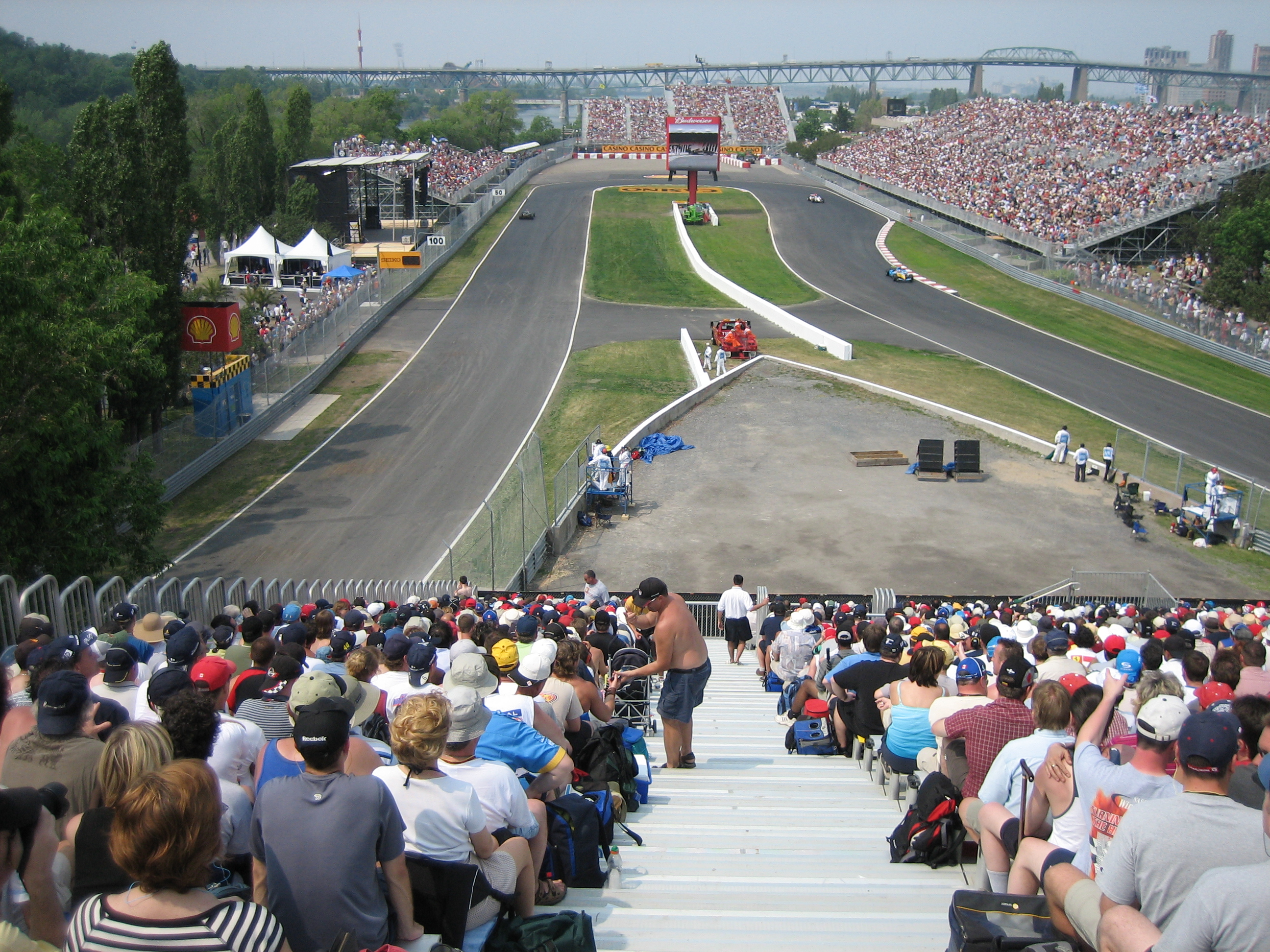
Circuit Gilles Villeneuve

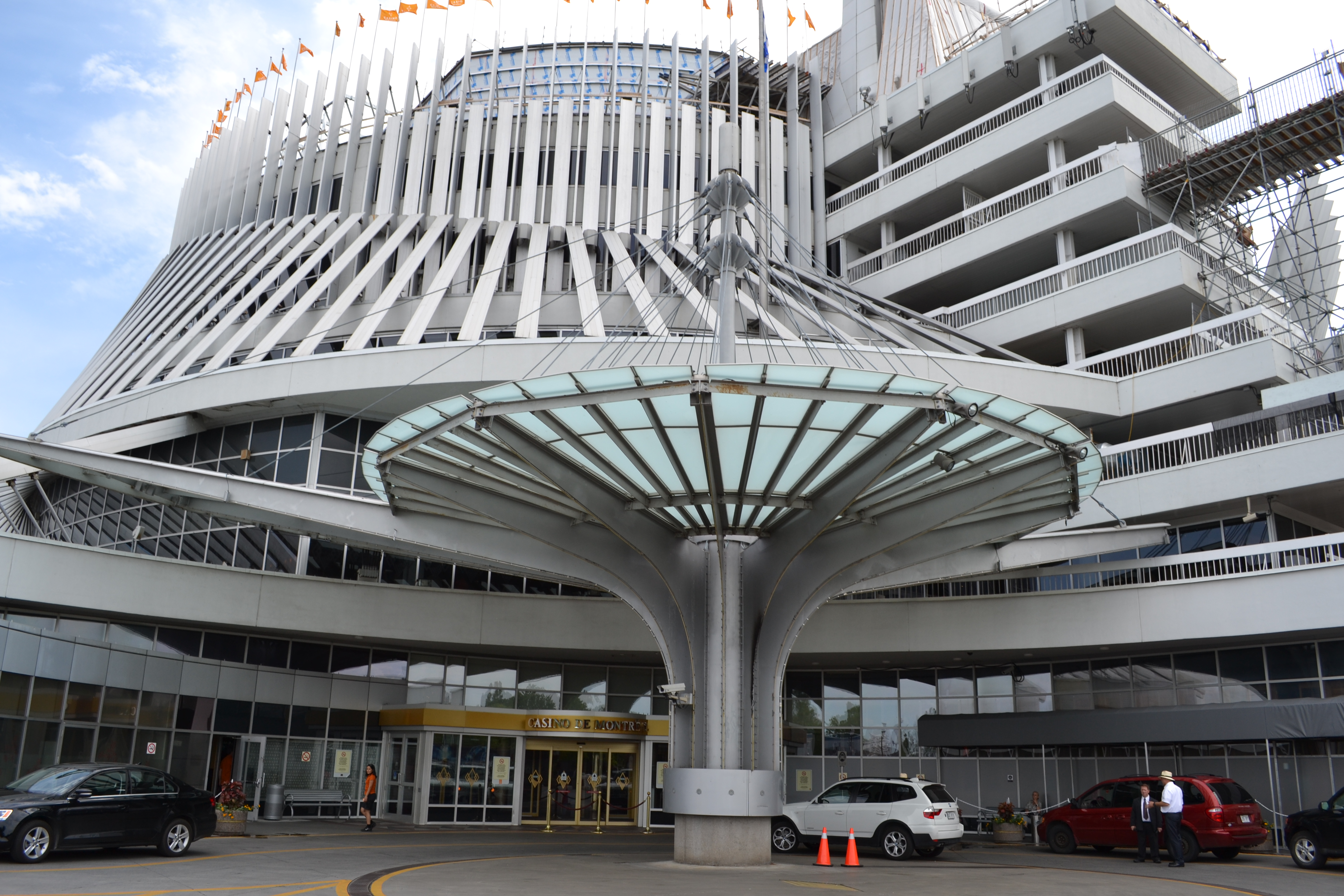
The Montreal Casino

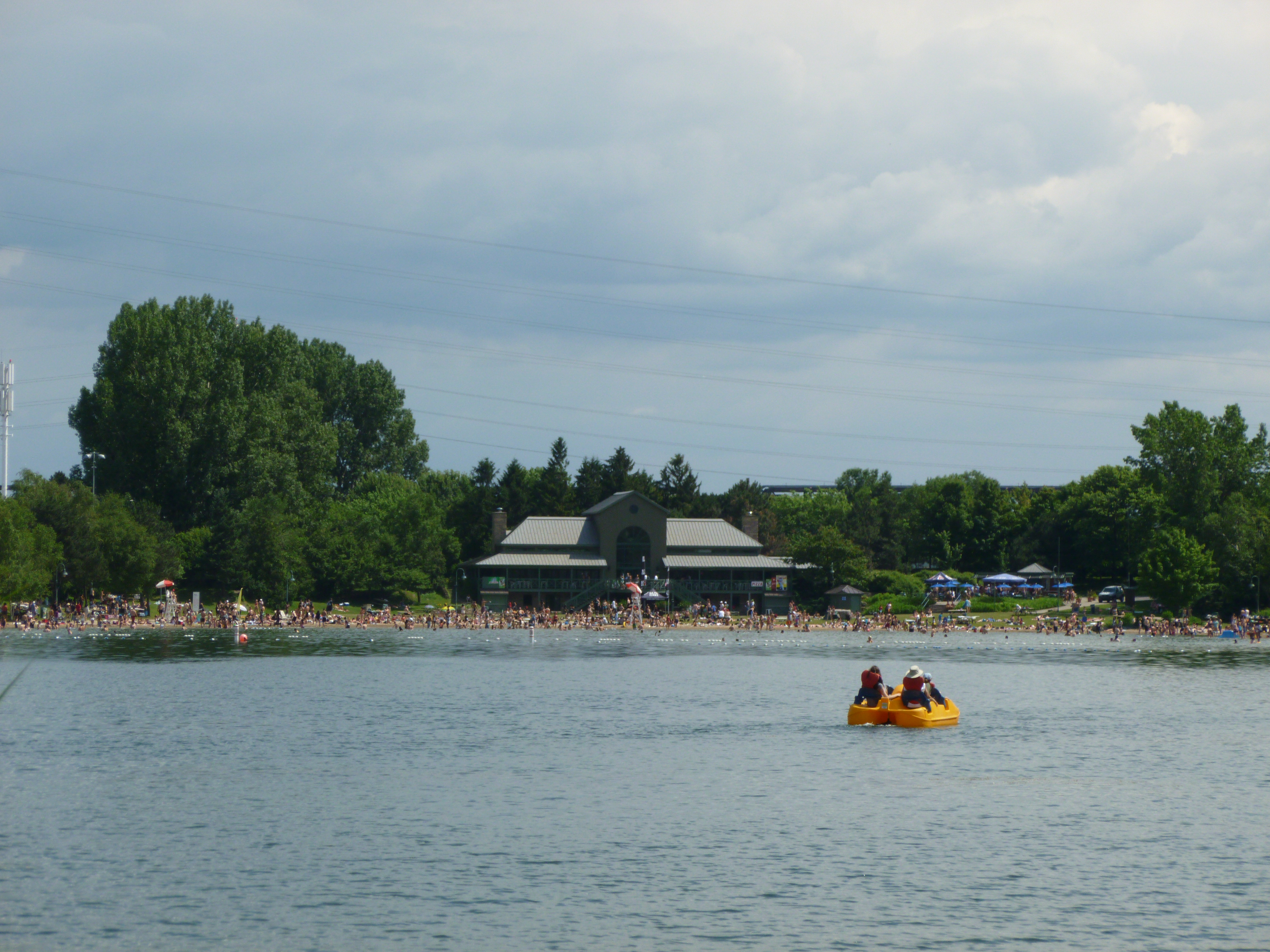
The beach during the summer

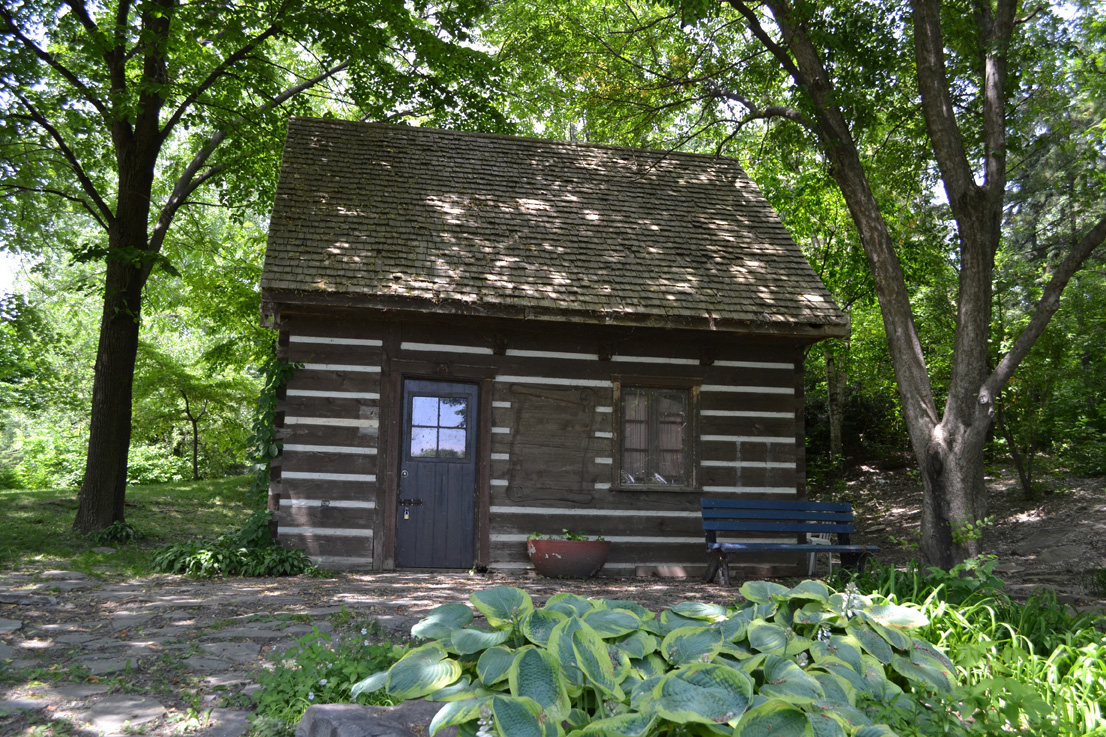
La Maison d'Autrefois du Québec

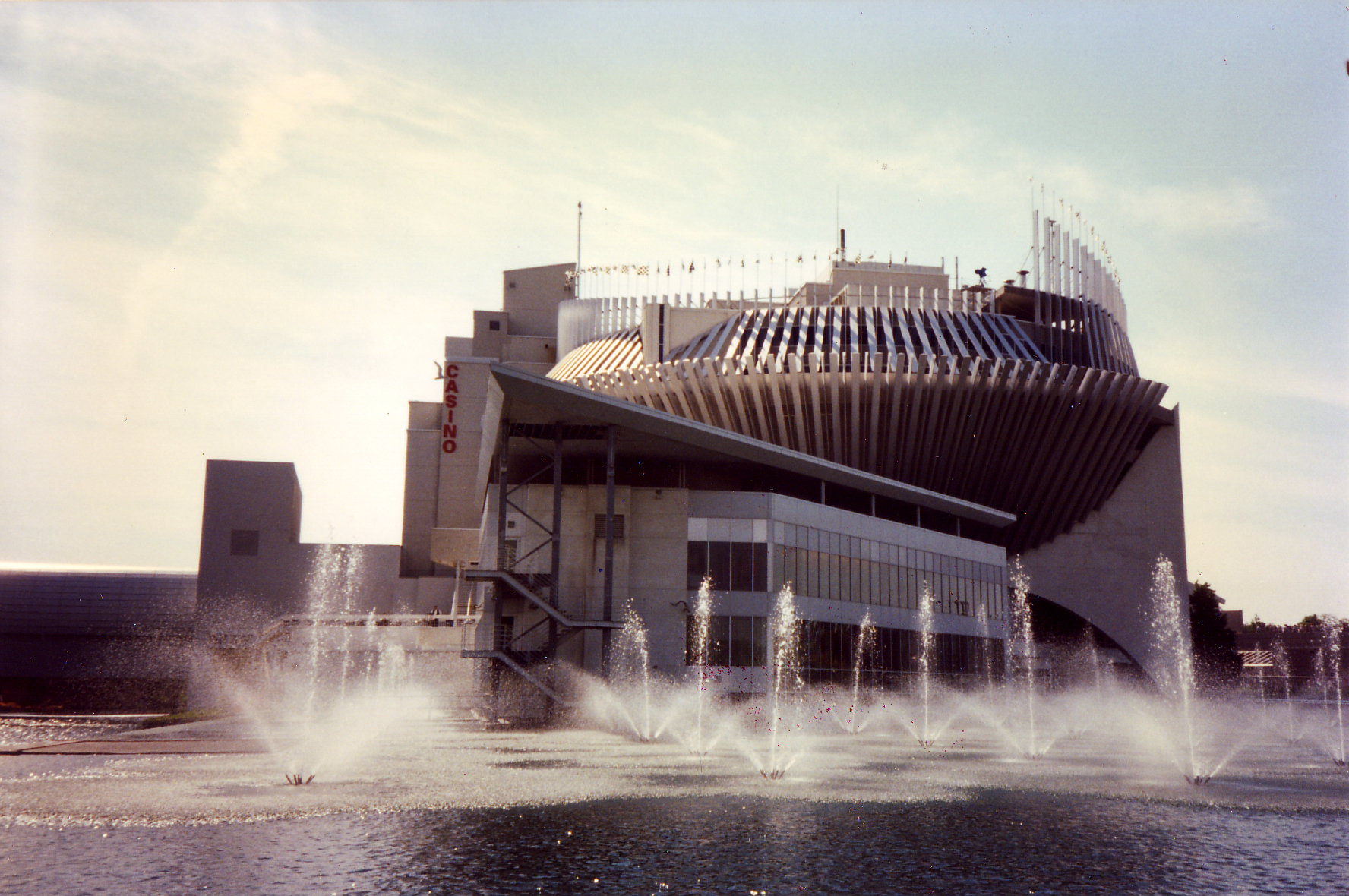
Casino de Montréal, photographed in 1996.

== See also ==
- Land reclamation
- List of islands of Quebec
