= Loto-Québec =

Quebec lottery and gaming commission

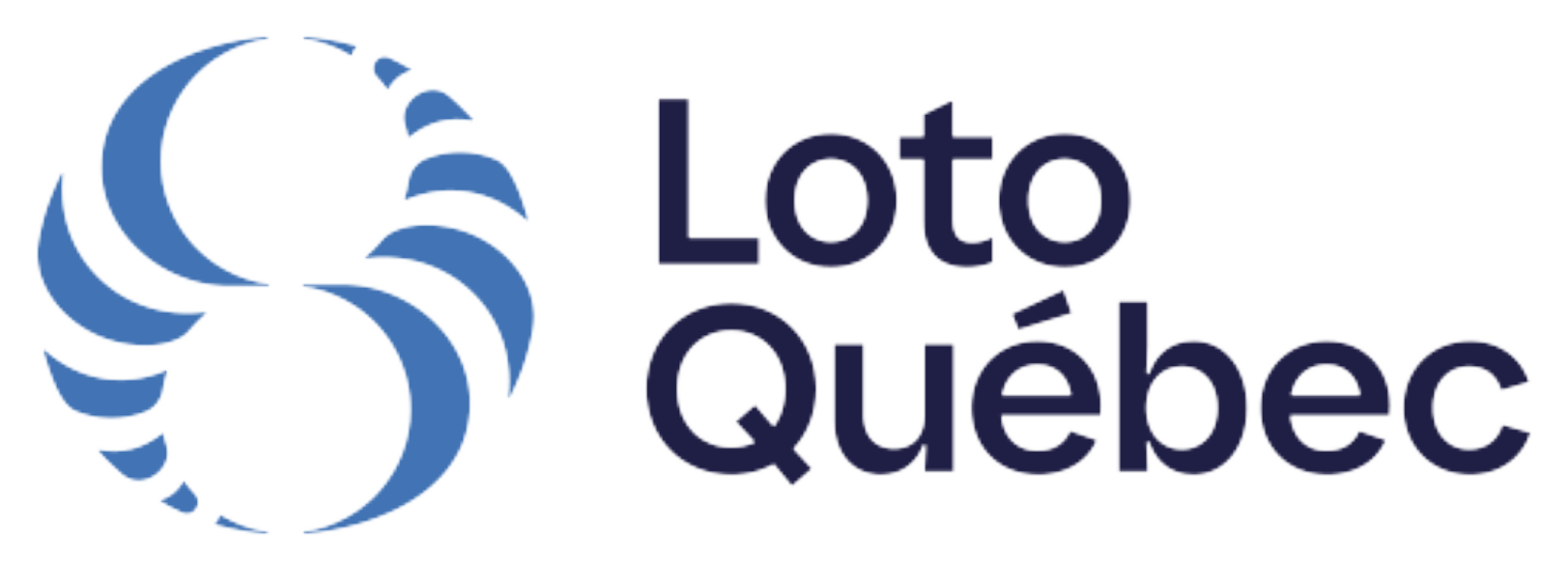
- Type: Crown corporation
- Founded: December 1969
- Headquarters: Montreal, Quebec, Canada
- Area served: Quebec
- Key people: Ann MacDonald (Chair of the Board of Directors); Jean-François Bergeron (President and Chief Executive Officer)
- Products: lotteries, casinos, gaming halls, online gaming, video lottery terminals, bingo, Kinzo
- Revenue: ▼CA$2.932 billion (2023)
- Net income: ▼CA$1,511 billion (2023)
- Owner: Government of Quebec
- Number of employees: 5,800
- Subsidiaries: Casiloc inc. Lotim Inc. Technologies Nter; Société des casinos du Québec; Société des établissements de jeux du Québec
- Website: societe.lotoquebec.com

Loto-Québec is a crown corporation in the Canadian province of Quebec. Established in 1969, it oversees lottery and gaming in the province.

The corporation operates lottery games such as draw games and scratch cards, casinos and gaming halls, bingo parlors, video lottery, and online gambling via its Espacejeux service. It is a member of the Interprovincial Lottery Corporation and administers national games within the province.

== Organization ==
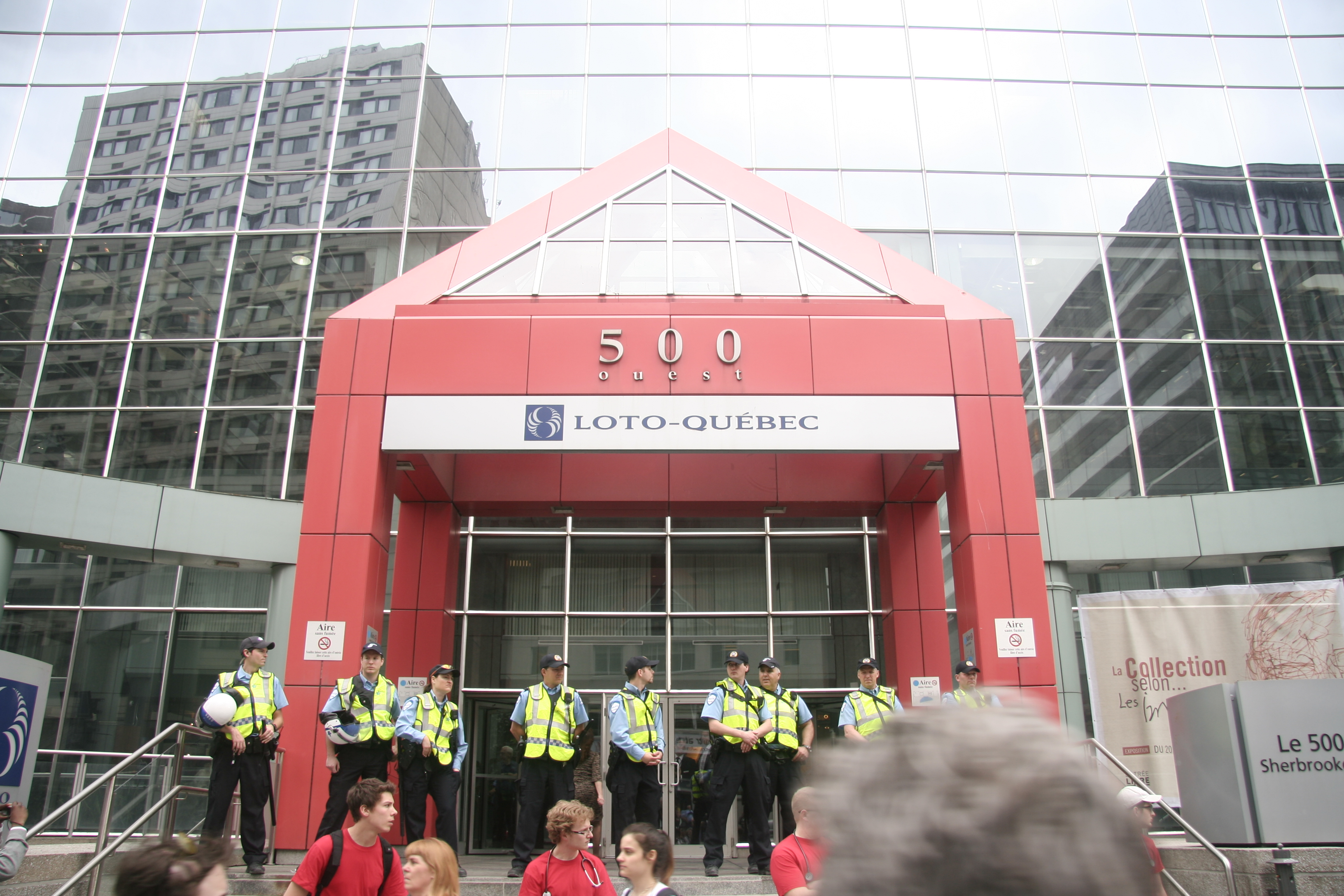
Loto-Québec's headquarters in Montreal, blocked during the 2012 Quebec student protests

Loto-Québec's activities are managed by several subsidiaries:

- The Société des casinos du Québec operates four casinos in the province (Casino de Montréal, Casino de Charlevoix, Casino du Lac-Leamy, and Casino de Mont-Tremblant) as well as restaurant and hotel services.
- The Société des établissements de jeux du Québec operates a network of around 12,000 video lottery terminals in bars, brasseries, and two gaming hall entertainment complexes in Quebec City and Trois-Rivières. It also operates a bingo network and a Kinzo hall.
- Casiloc inc. is responsible for construction projects, acquiring furniture and equipment, and renting casino premises. It is also in charge of purchasing property for the lottery, video lottery, and bingo sectors of operations.
- Lotim Inc. owns the building at 500 Sherbrooke Street West in Montréal that houses the head offices of Loto-Québec and its subsidiaries.
- Technologies Nter develops or acquires and operates computer systems that support Loto-Québec.

Loto-Québec employs more than 5,000 people including nearly 4,500 in its four casinos.

The corporation has a program for the acquisition of contemporary Quebec art in its Collection Loto-Québec. The collection holds more than 4,900 works of art created by roughly 1,200 Quebec artists.

== History ==
In 1969, the Government of Quebec passed the Act respecting the Société des loteries du Québec, and created a government corporation to operate legalized games of chance in the province. The first draw made by the newly formed government corporation was held on March 14, 1970, and the lottery, called Inter Loto, had a jackpot of C$125,000, while tickets cost $2.

At the time, no law specified which level of government would have jurisdiction over the operation of games of chance. For this reason, the Government of Canada created a lottery in 1972 to finance the 1976 Summer Olympics to be held in Montreal. In 1976, that organization became known as Loto-Canada. However, due to sustained pressure from the provinces, Loto-Canada was dissolved in 1979, and the management and operation of games of chance fell under provincial jurisdiction. Provinces are, however, required to transfer a part of their lottery profits to the federal government. In 2006, this transfer amounted to C$14.1 million.

In 1976, Loto-Québec held its first million-dollar draw in a lottery called Super Loto. On June 12, 1982, Lotto 6/49 became the first pan-Canadian lottery, with a jackpot of C$500,000. In 1993, a weekly game show produced by Loto-Québec and Canadian broadcaster TVA made its debut as La Poule aux œufs d'or. Each week, contestants will choose one of twenty-four golden eggs to win cash prizes with a progressive jackpot starting at C$150,000. The show was first hosted by Guy Mongrain.

On May 25, 2004, activists and public personalities came together to create the EmJEU coalition (Ethics for moderation in gambling). The members demanded secure and ethical administration at Loto-Québec and for the entire game of chance industry.

On June 22, 2005, in partnership with Cirque du Soleil, Loto-Québec proposed to relocate the Casino de Montréal in the Peel Street Basin, close to the Old Port's Cité du Havre, to become part of an entertainment complex that would include a hotel and a performance hall. The project was criticised by the population, the EmJEU coalition, and the Montreal public health authority, which issued a Public Health Warning. Following the March 10, 2006 publication of the government-ordered Guy Coulombe report that imposed strict conditions on the project, Cirque du Soleil withdrew from the project and the casino relocation proposal was dropped.

On March 30, 2006, Loto-Québec became an official partner in the Casinos Développement Europe group through its Casino Mundial subsidiary, with a 35% share ownership position. The other two partners are Bridgepoint Capital (55%) and a group of senior managers of this group formerly known as Moliflor Loisirs (10%). On November 2, 2006, the Quebec Cabinet authorized Loto-Québec to open four gaming halls in Québec, to be known as Ludoplexes, in Montreal, Quebec City, Trois-Rivières, and Mont-Tremblant. This authorization allowed Loto-Québec to reduce the number of VLTs, intended to tighten access, as a part of its 2004 development plan. The plan has, among other features, a reduction. The number of VLTs dropped 20%, from 14,301 in 2006 to 11,410 in 2009, while the number of VLT locations went from 3663 to 2327. The 11,410 video lottery terminals generate sales of $670 million. The Trois-Rivières casino was opened on October 25, 2007, and the Quebec City casino opened on December 6, 2007. On June 24, 2009, the Casino de Mont-Tremblant was inaugurated, replacing the originally planned gaming hall in that location.

Serge Chevalier estimates that the majority of revenues from these terminals come from problem gamblers, a conclusion that Loto-Québec contests. On September 15, 2008, begun in 2002 by former gambler Jean Brochu, the suit accused Loto-Québec of encouraging the use of VLTs without informing users of the danger of developing a dependency on this type of game of chance. An out-of-court settlement between the parties was reached in December 2009.

In March 2009, Loto-Québec announced a plan to renovate the Casino de Montréal for C$100 million. On April 1, 2009, Loto-Québec was awarded the highest available level of international certification (Level 4) in the field of responsible gaming by the World Lottery Association (WLA). On January 26, 2010, the Government of Québec authorized the Société des loteries du Québec to offer online gaming and made its decision public on February 3 of the same year.

With oppositions from Institut national de santé publique du Québec managers and the EmJEU coalition for a government moratorium, Loto-Québec stated that "online gaming is already a reality with more than 2,000 illegal gaming sites available and practically no responsible gaming measures in place." A petition was tabled in the National Assembly of Québec. Nonetheless, Loto-Québec launched its Espacejeux.com on December 1, 2010. On March 23, 2010, Quebec Superior Court Justice Gratien Duchesne approved the December 2009 out-of-court settlement. The plaintiffs acknowledged that video lottery terminals were not the cause of compulsive gambling. The Government of Quebec agreed to refund the cost of therapy for compulsive gamblers in 1994–2002. Québec Medicare covers the costs since 2002. The agreement capped the total amount of indemnity payments at $50 million, whereas the plaintiff had claimed damages of around $800 million for their estimated 120,000 compulsive gamblers in Québec (this figure has been contested by Loto-Québec).

On October 19, 2010, the Société des bingos du Québec (SBQ) launched Kinzo, a bingo hall concept that features shorter games and a lounge-like atmosphere with bar service, designed to appeal to younger clientele than traditional bingo halls.

== See also ==
- Société des casinos du Québec
- Interprovincial Lottery Corporation
