= Montreal Casino =

Casino in Montreal, Quebec, Canada

- The main building of the casino (2017).

- Location of the Montreal Casino
- Interactive map of Montreal Casino
- Location: 1, avenue du Casino Montreal, Quebec H3C 4W7; 45°30′19.7″N 73°31′33.5″W
- Opened: October 9, 1993
- Owner: Société des casinos du Québec (Loto-Québec)
- Architect: Jean Faugeron
- Public transit access: Jean-Drapeau; 777 Jean-Drapeau/Casino/Bonaventure
- Website: casinos.lotoquebec.com/en/montreal/home

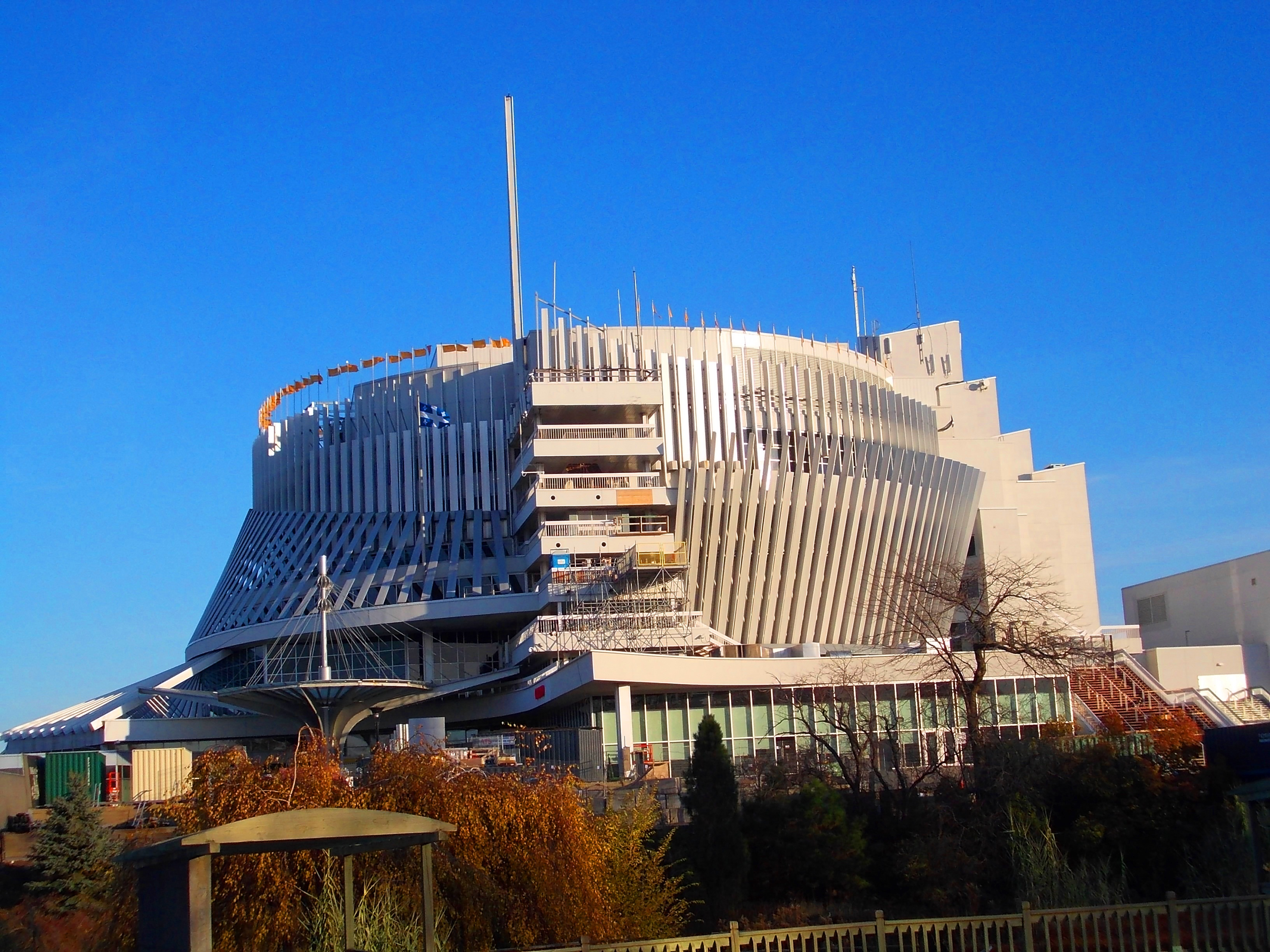
The former France Pavilion, now part of the Montreal Casino

The Montreal Casino (French: Casino de Montréal) located in Montreal, Quebec, is the largest casino in Canada. Situated on Notre Dame Island, in Jean-Drapeau Park, it consists of two former Expo 67 pavilion buildings. The casino is open to the public seven days a week, operating morning until late night. It opened on October 9, 1993.

The casino is owned and operated by the Société des casinos du Québec (a subsidiary of Loto-Québec), which owns three other casinos in the province. All profits go to the provincial Government of Quebec. As of 2019, it employed 2,800 people.

== Grounds ==
The casino is located within the St. Lawrence River on Notre Dame Island–a man-made island built for the 1967 World's Fair. It is situated within Jean-Drapeau Park, an urban park and former grounds of Expo 67, and shares the island with the Gilles Villeneuve racing circuit, the Olympic Basin and an artificial lake with small beach.

Access to the casino is served by the De la Concorde bridge through Cité du Havre, or by public transit via the Jean Drapeau Metro station (on the neighbouring Saint Helen's Island) and then boarding a dedicated connecting bus.

== History ==
In 1992, the government of Quebec created the Société des casinos du Québec (SCQ) and tasked them to build casinos in the province. The Montreal Casino was the first of the two casinos to be founded for the project and cost $95 million to build. The casino replaced the Palais des civilisations which used to showcase international cultural exhibitions, and prior to that was the Quebec Pavilion during Expo 67. It also made use of the formerly vacant France pavilion, which was annexed via a constructed bridge way when both buildings were renovated to become the casino.

The casino received thousands of players within the first few weeks of its opening and 780,000 in its first year. During its opening year, it employed 700 people. In 1993, the Casino went through its first major expansion. In 1997, it extended its business hours to 24-hour operation. In July 2003, the Casino became a non-smoking establishment; closure of its smoking lounges followed in May 2006 with the passing of a new provincial law.

In 2013, the Casino saw a second major renovation when Loto-Québec collaborated with Moment Factory to renew its gaming areas. A new installation featured a digital wall whose size stretched out over three floors. In late 2014, it opened the area dubbed "The Zone."

In 2020, following the COVID-19 pandemic, the Casino terminated 24-hour operation for the first time since the implementation of around-the-clock operation in 1997, and began closing at 3:00 a.m. (5:00 a.m. on weekends).

In 2021, the casino's fine dining establishment L'Atelier de Joël Robuchon permanently closed.

== Features and events ==
The casino consists of three interconnected buildings. Two of these, the France Pavilion and the Québec Pavilion, were built for Expo 67. The third is an annex built by the casino to the south and east of the main building. An enclosed bridge joins the annex to the former Quebec Pavilion. The main building has six floors, in addition to the annex and the secondary building (with four floors). The casino boasts a gaming floor of over 526,000 sq ft (12.1 acres; 48,900 m^{2}). Within the three structures there are over 3,000 slot machines, over 80 gaming tables and large number of speed lotteries and virtual games. The casino also contains three restaurants, five bars, a cabaret, and meeting and banquet facilities. The casino is known for certain unconventional structural features for such an establishment, such as its numerous windows and low ceilings.

The Montreal Casino holds all kinds of events and shows throughout the year, including band performances, dances, and comedy shows. Most events are free for visitors while others charge a fee for tickets. Every year, the casino holds a New Year's party which lasts from the afternoon all the way to the morning of the next day. The casino invites DJs and musicians to the venue and features a giant screen showing the New Year's Eve countdown.

== Keno scandal ==
In April 1994, Daniel Corriveau won $600,000 CAD playing keno. He picked 19 of the 20 winning numbers three times in a row. Corriveau claims he used a computer to discern a pattern in the sequence of numbers, based on chaos theory. However, it was later found that the sequence was easy to predict because the casino was using an inadequate electronic pseudorandom number generator. In fact, the keno machine was reset every morning with the same seed number, resulting in the same sequence of numbers being generated. Corriveau received his winnings after investigators cleared him of any wrongdoing.

== See also ==
- Expo 67
- Québec Pavilion
- List of casinos in Canada
- Montreal
- Parc Jean-Drapeau
- Polytope de Montréal
