= Casino du Lac-Leamy =

Casino in Gatineau, Quebec, Canada

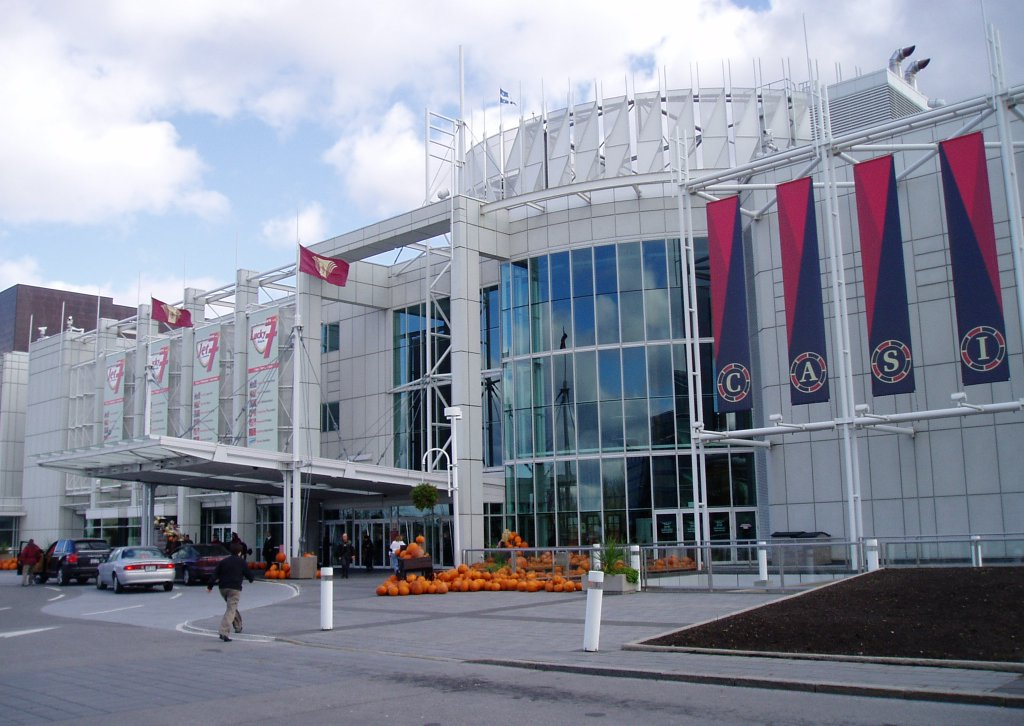
- The Casino du Lac-Leamy
- Interactive map of Casino du Lac-Leamy
- Location: 1, boulevard du Casino Gatineau, Quebec J8Y 6W3; 45°26′48″N 075°43′36″W
- Opened: March 24, 1996
- Owner: Société des casinos du Québec
- Previous names: Casino de Hull
- Website: casinos.lotoquebec.com/en/lacleamy/home

Casino du Lac-Leamy Ottawa/Gatineau (Casino) Heliport
- IATA: none; ICAO: none; TC LID: CTA9

Summary
- Airport type: Public
- Owner/Operator: Casiloc Inc.
- Serves: Ottawa/Gatineau
- Location: Gatineau, Quebec
- Time zone: EST (UTC−05:00)
  - Summer (DST): EDT (UTC−04:00)
- Elevation AMSL: 220 ft (67 m)
- Coordinates: 45°26′48″N 075°43′36″W

Map
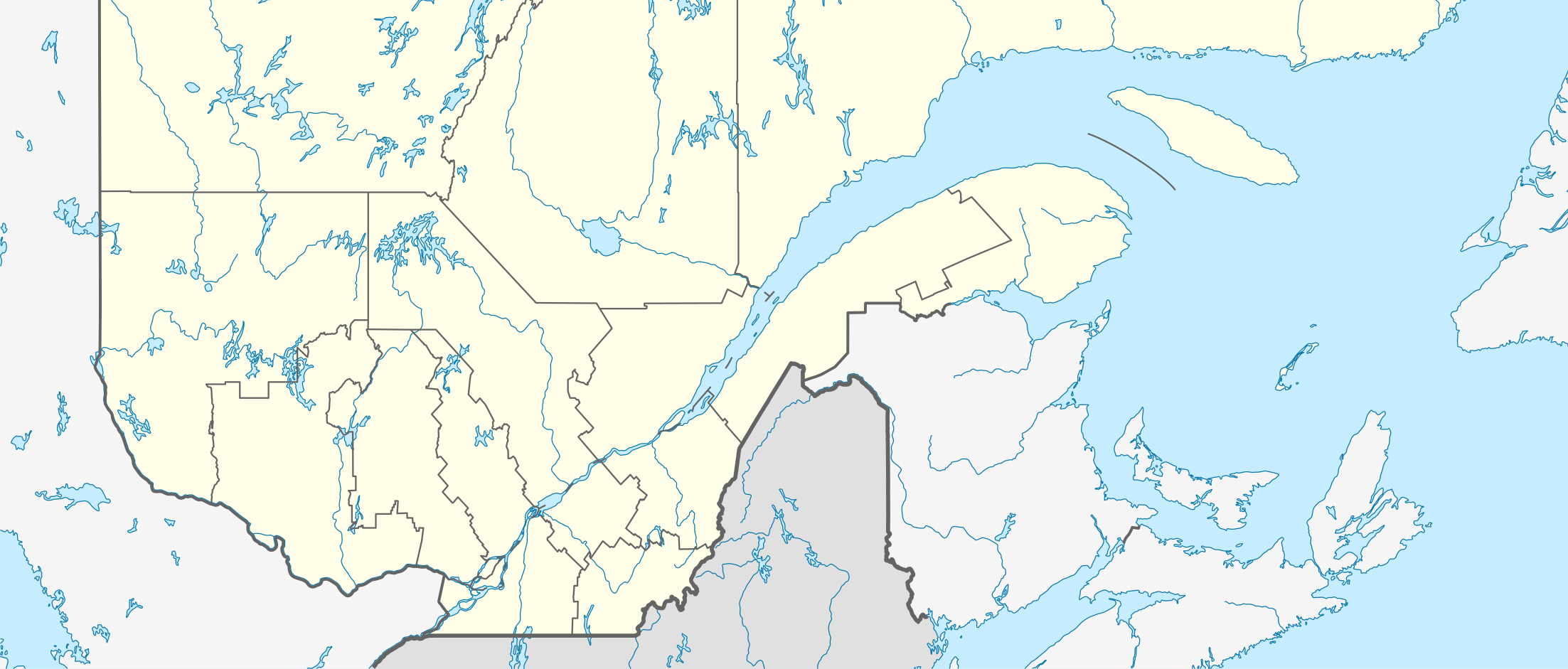
- Location in Quebec

Helipads
Number	Length		Surface
Number	ft	m	Surface
1	79 (dia)	24 (dia)	Concrete
- Canada Flight Supplement

The Casino du Lac-Leamy (formerly the Casino de Hull) is a government-run casino located in Gatineau, Quebec, Canada.

The casino was opened on March 24, 1996, in the former city of Hull, Quebec, the third of a group of casinos built by the provincial government to raise funds. Ottawa, the larger city across the Ottawa River, was also planning to build a casino in the early 1990s, but these plans were blocked by the Government of Ontario. The Gatineau casino thus also serves the nearby city of Ottawa and Eastern Ontario. It is operated by Société des casinos du Québec, a subsidiary of Loto-Québec. In 2016, the casino provided the government with some CA$244,679,000 in profit, employed more than 1,400 people and attracted more than two and a half million visitors.

The casino is built on a rocky precipice over what was once International Portland Cement Company quarry but is today Lac de la Carrière. This lake is home to a large fountain, whose jet is visible through much of the old Hull sector during the summer. To the east of the casino is Leamy Lake (French: Lac Leamy), from which it gets its name. Attached to the casino is a 349-room Hilton hotel. The casino also has an 1,100-seat theatre that has become one of the main music venues in the Outaouais region. The casino is also home to several bars and restaurants. In the casino itself there are more than 1,800 slot machines and more than 65 tables including roulette, blackjack, baccarat, craps, and Texas hold 'em poker.

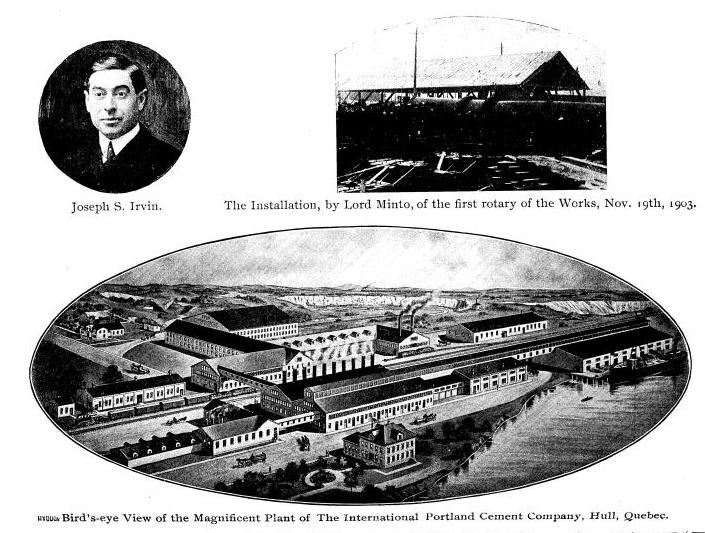
Bird's-eye view of the plant of the International Portland Cement Company, Hull, Quebec 1904 located where the Casino du Lac-Leamy stands now

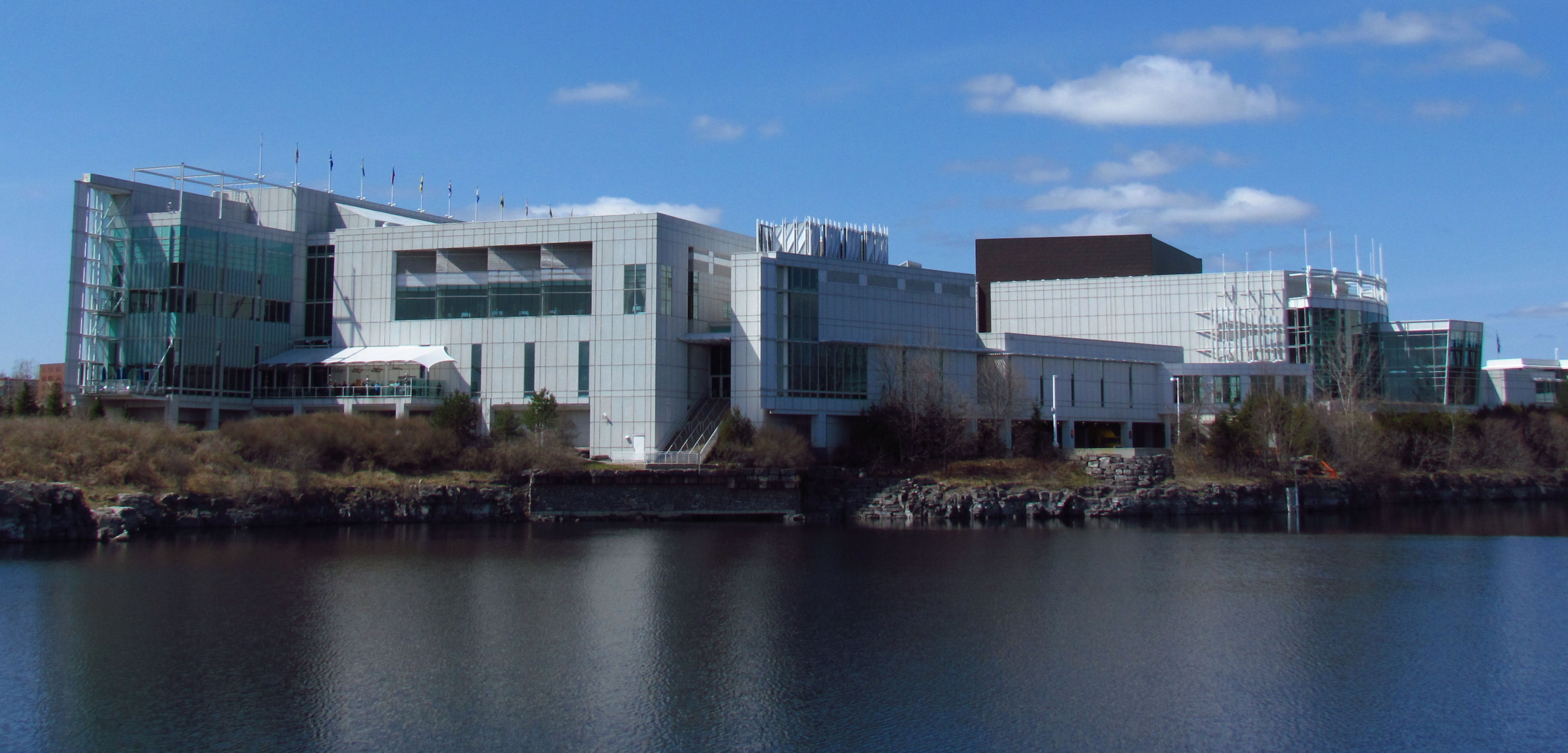
Viewed from Lac de la Carrière

== See also ==
- List of casinos in Canada
