= Charles Monsarrat =

Canadian-born bridge designer

Charles Nicholas Monsarrat (July 2, 1871 – March 1, 1940) was a Canadian-born bridge designer.

He was born in Montreal and was educated by private tuition and at the High School of Montreal. Monsarrat joined the Canadian Pacific Railway as a structural draftsman; in 1903, he became chief engineer of bridges. He became a member of the Canadian Society of Civil Engineers (later the Engineering Institute of Canada) in 1898 and was vice-president in 1917. He married Mary Alice Foster in 1898. Monsarrat served with the Royal Highlanders in France during World War I, becoming lieutenant-colonel in 1915. From 1911 to 1918, he was president and chief engineer of the Quebec Bridge Board. Monsarrat also served as a consulting engineer to the Canadian government and to the Canadian National Railway. In 1921, he became a partner in a consulting company with Philip Louis Pratley. The company was responsible for the design and supervision of construction for the Jacques Cartier Bridge at Montreal, the Île d'Orléans Bridge at Quebec City, the Ambassador Bridge between Detroit and Windsor, the Lions Gate Bridge at Vancouver and the Angus L. Macdonald Bridge at Halifax, Nova Scotia.

He died in Montreal at the age of 68.
