= Circuit Gilles Villeneuve =

Motorsport race track in Montreal, Canada

- Grand Prix Circuit (2002–present)
- Location: Parc Jean-Drapeau, Montreal, Quebec, Canada
- Coordinates: 45°30′02″N 73°31′21″W
- Capacity: 100,000
- FIA Grade: 1
- Owner: City of Montreal
- Broke ground: 1978
- Opened: 6 October 1978; 48 years ago
- Architect: Roger Peart
- Former names: Île Notre-Dame Circuit (1978–1982)
- Major events: Current: Formula One; Canadian Grand Prix (1978–1986, 1988–2008, 2010–2019, 2022–present); Former: Champ Car World Series; Grand Prix of Montreal (2002–2006); NASCAR Nationwide Series; NAPA Auto Parts 200 (2007–2012); World Sportscar Championship (1990)
- Website: http://www.circuitgillesvilleneuve.ca

Grand Prix Circuit (2002–present)
- Length: 4.361 km (2.710 mi)
- Turns: 14
- Race lap record: 1:13.078 ( (Finland) Valtteri Bottas, Mercedes W10, 2019)

Grand Prix Circuit (1996–2001)
- Length: 4.421 km (2.747 mi)
- Turns: 13
- Race lap record: 1:17.205 ( (Germany) Ralf Schumacher, Williams FW23, 2001)

Grand Prix Circuit (1994–1995)
- Length: 4.450 km (2.765 mi)
- Turns: 20
- Race lap record: 1:28.927 ( (Germany) Michael Schumacher, Benetton B194, 1994)

Grand Prix Circuit (1988–1993)
- Length: 4.430 km (2.753 mi)
- Turns: 17
- Race lap record: 1:21.500 ( (Germany) Michael Schumacher, Benetton B193, 1993)

Grand Prix Circuit (1978–1986)
- Length: 4.410 km (2.740 mi)
- Turns: 19
- Race lap record: 1:25.443 ( (Brazil) Nelson Piquet, Williams FW11, 1986)

The Circuit Gilles Villeneuve, also spelled Circuit Gilles-Villeneuve (French pronunciation: [siʁ.kɥi ʒil vilnœv]), is a 4.361 km (2.710 mi) motor racing circuit on Notre Dame Island in Montreal, Quebec, Canada. It is the venue for the FIA Formula One Canadian Grand Prix. It has previously hosted the World Sportscar Championship, the Champ Car World Series (Grand Prix of Montreal), the NASCAR Pinty’s Series, the NASCAR Nationwide Series (NAPA Auto Parts 200), and the Grand-Am Rolex Sports Car Series.

== Formula One at Montréal ==
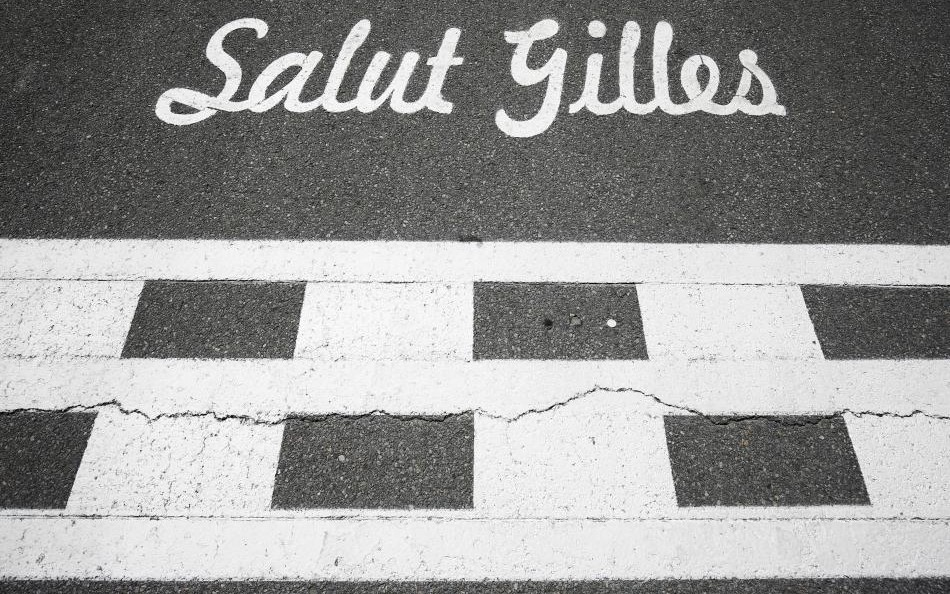
Start-finish-line at Circuit Gilles-Villeneuve

The Canadian Grand Prix was first held at the circuit in 1978, where hometown hero Gilles Villeneuve (1950–1982) won for Scuderia Ferrari. The Grand Prix quickly became a mainstay of the Formula One calendar, with the race taking place in Montreal for the next thirty years. Once held in late September, the event was moved to its present location on the calendar of mid-June in 1982, to provide a warmer, more pleasant race weekend.

The race was dropped from the 2009 Formula One calendar and replaced with the inaugural Abu Dhabi Grand Prix, after running over two decades uninterrupted. On November 27, 2009, Quebec's officials and Canadian Grand Prix organizers announced a settlement with Formula One Administration and signed a new five-year contract spanning the 2010–2014 seasons.

The 2011 edition of the race was the longest World Championship Grand Prix ever at over 4 hours in length, due to a lengthy rain delay.

== Circuit history ==
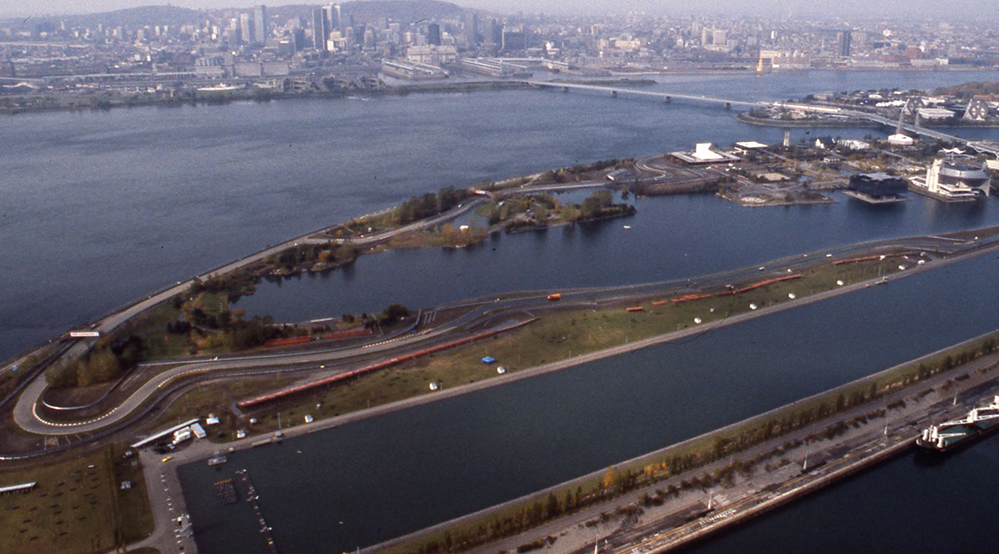
Île Notre-Dame Circuit in the middle of the St. Lawrence river (1978)

Originally named the Île Notre-Dame Circuit, the circuit was built and finished in 1978. In what has proven to be the venue's main event over the decades, the FIA Formula One Canadian Grand Prix had been part of the Formula One World Championship for 10 years. It was previously held at Mosport Park near Toronto on 8 occasions and in 1968 and 1970, the Mont-Tremblant circuit in Quebec. With safety concerns with Mosport blighting the 1977 event, it was decided to move the race to the new circuit in Montréal. In 1982, it was renamed in honour of Canadian Formula One driver Gilles Villeneuve, father of Jacques Villeneuve, following his death earlier in the year. The circuit is located in Parc Jean-Drapeau in the city of Montréal. The park is named after the mayor of Montréal who was responsible for the organization of Expo 67.

The race circuit is on Notre Dame Island, a man-made island in the St. Lawrence River most of which was originally built up for the Expo in 1967. Saint Helen's Island to the northwest was artificially enlarged for the Expo '67 fairgrounds and a prominent remnant of the fair, the Biosphere is located adjacent to the circuit. Almost half of the track—from the hairpin turn until after the pit area—runs alongside the Olympic Basin, a huge rectangular basin which was created for the rowing and canoeing events of Montréal's 1976 Summer Olympics.

Over the winter of 2018–19 the paddock—in use since 1988—was demolished and replaced with the current structure.

== Circuit layout ==
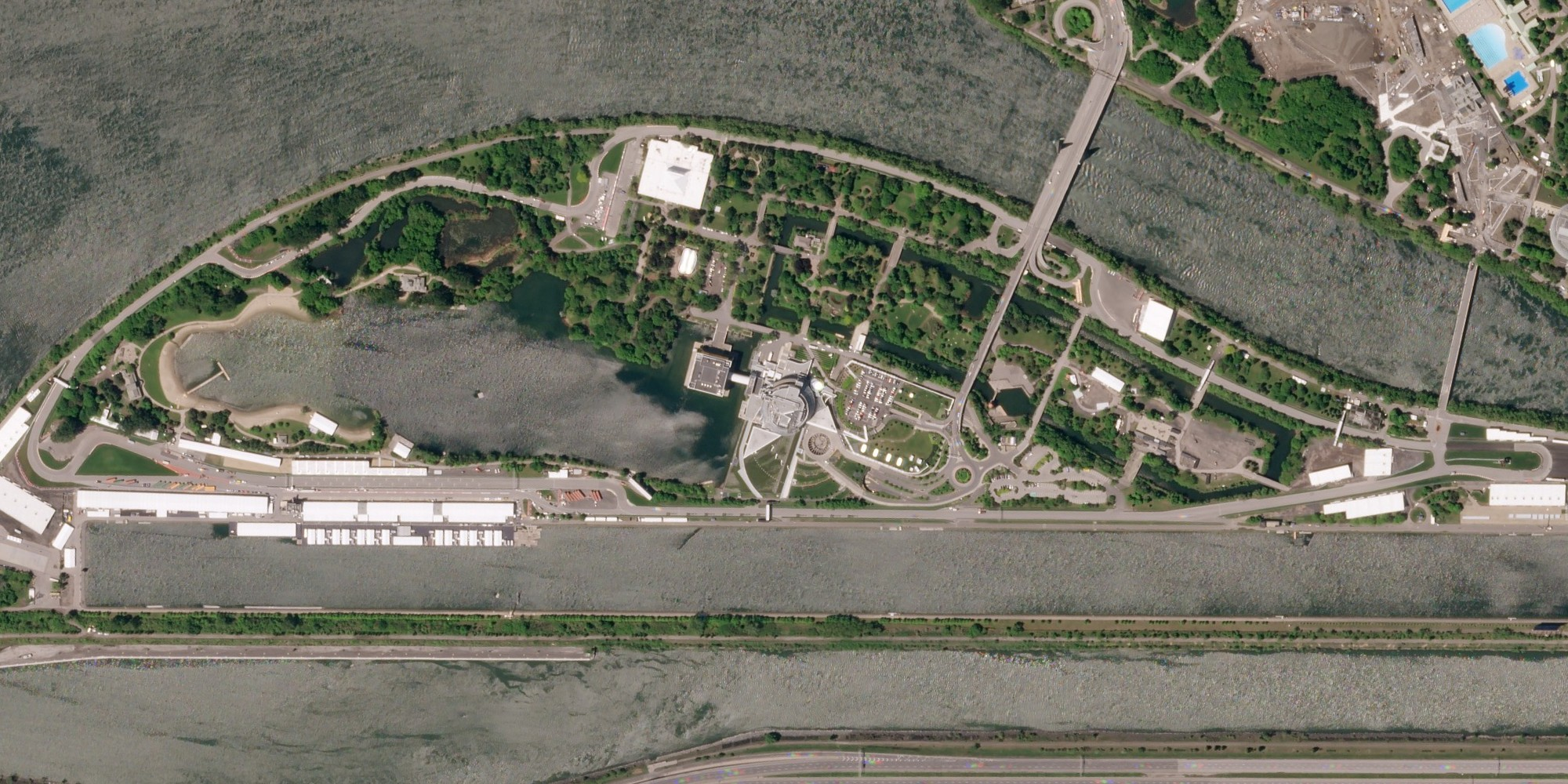
Satellite picture of the circuit, taken in May 2018

Barriers run close to the circuit and many experienced drivers have been caught out by them. A particularly famous part of the circuit is the wall on the outside of the exit of the final chicane before the start/finish straight. In 1999 the wall, which bears the name Bienvenue au Québec ("Welcome to Quebec") giving it the nickname "Mur du Québec" (Quebec Wall), ended the race of three Formula One World Champions, Damon Hill, Michael Schumacher and Jacques Villeneuve along with FIA GT champion Ricardo Zonta. Since then the wall has been nicknamed "The Wall of Champions". In subsequent years, 2009 world champion Jenson Button (2005) and four time World Champion Sebastian Vettel (2011, during free practice) also became victims of the wall.

For the first few years of its existence, the track consisted of technical, medium speed chicanes and a relatively low overall lap speed. However, over the years the circuit has transformed into a power track, with straight line speed being very much a priority. Between 1986 and 1988 (with a one-year hiatus occurring in 1987), the pitlane and start-finish straight were relocated from the hairpin to the exit of the fast right-left chicane, which became the final corner. After the fatal crashes of Roland Ratzenberger and Ayrton Senna at Imola earlier in the year, in 1994 a chicane was inserted between the Casino corner and the hairpin to decrease top speed. The 1996 race saw both the chicane and the Casino corner removed and the layout changed; the run from the hairpin at the bottom of the circuit was turned into a straight.

In 2002 the exit of the pitlane was changed to make exiting the pitlane safer for drivers. This also shortened the length of the circuit.

Changes made in 2005 to the curbs on the final chicane were controversial amongst drivers in the run-up to the Grand Prix. The curbs were made higher and more difficult for the drivers to see, making it even more challenging.

On June 23, 2006, the Canadian Press reported that the city of Montréal had awarded exclusive rights to stage the two allowed race weekends on the track to Normand Legault, promoter of the Formula One Canadian Grand Prix. The deal was for 2007 to 2011, with an option for 2012 to 2016. Legault decided to replace the Champ Car race with races from the Grand American Road Racing Association's Rolex Series and NASCAR Nationwide Series, respectively – the latter series' first race north of the Canada-United States border. On August 4, 2007, Kevin Harvick made history by winning the first NASCAR Busch Series (now Xfinity Series) race at Circuit Gilles Villeneuve in what was one of the most controversial NASCAR races ever, as Robby Gordon claimed to have won the race. The NASCAR races have affected the circuit layout. An expansion of the pit lane took place, since a NASCAR pit lane must accommodate a minimum of 43 cars. The 2008 race made history as the first NASCAR race to run on rain tires.

In 2017, due to the higher cornering speeds of the new Formula One cars and the new safety requirements imposed by the FIA, the circuit had additional Tecpro barriers installed, following the removal of older tire barriers by May 2017. With the 2017 technical regulations, experts predicted the F1 cars to be quicker by three to five seconds a lap in June at Montréal. 2017's F1 event also saw a change to the exit of the last chicane (the Wall of Champions) with its angle modified, because the FIA found it was dangerous.

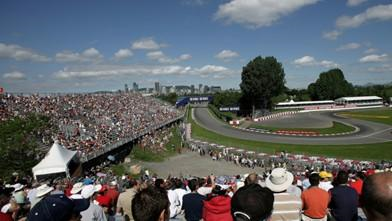
Exit of Turn 2, Senna 'S' during F1 event

=== Senna 'S' turns ===
The complex of turns one and two has become known as the Senna 'S'. From a bird's eye view turns one and two together can represent an 'S' shape.

=== Pont de la Concorde corner ===
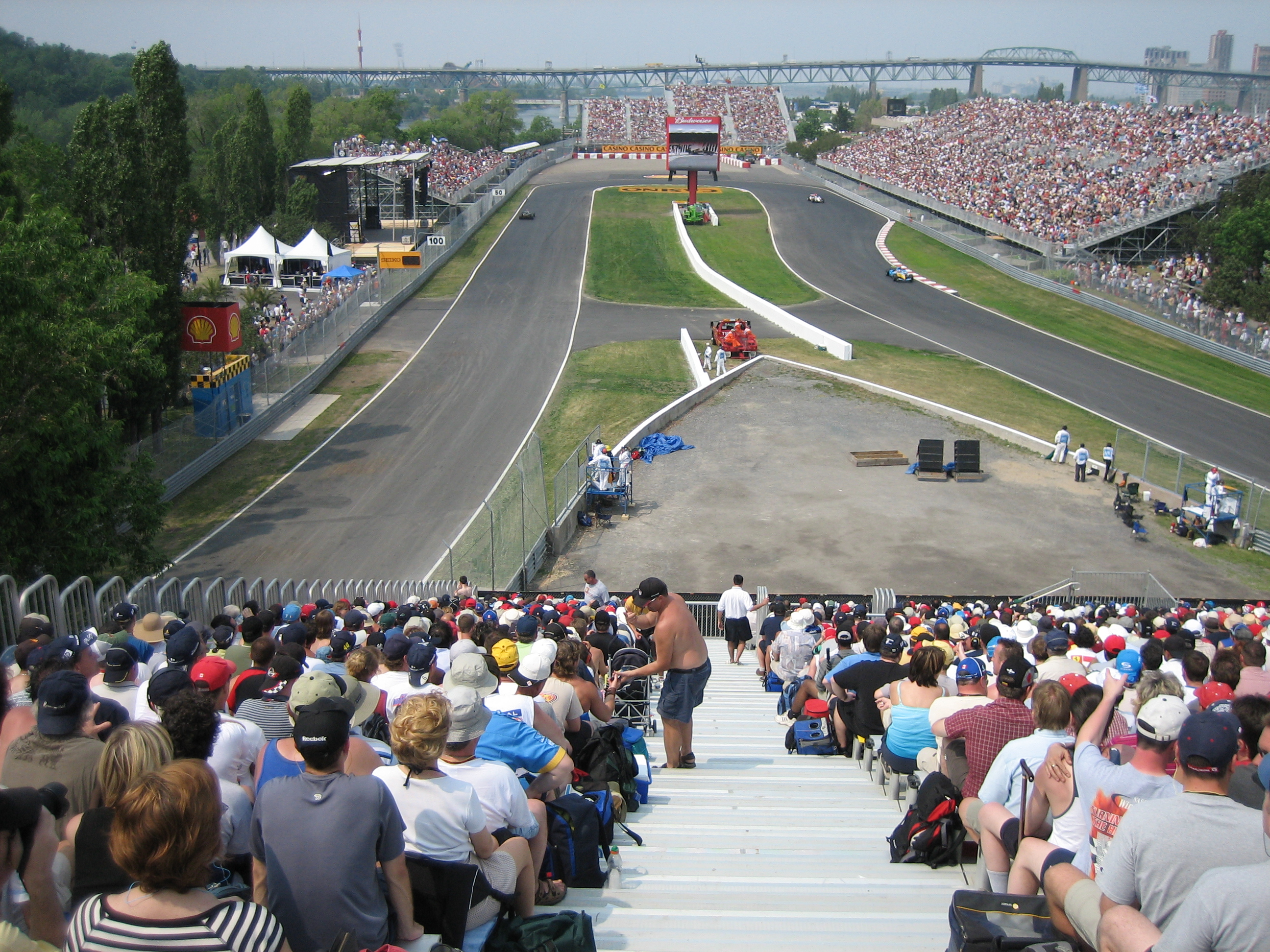
The Hairpin (L'Epingle) on Circuit Gilles Villeneuve

The very fast Pont de la Concorde corner (Turn 8) is after the bridge underpass and is known as a 'quick kink' before Turn 9 and the rush to a passing zone at the Hairpin curve.

=== The Hairpin Curve ===
Turn 10 at Île Notre-Dame is probably the best example of a 180° hairpin turn design with full wheel lock during F1 competition. The various lines taken entering the hairpin curve can lead to overtaking on the apex, or exit during race competition. Braking too late can see cars offline into the runoff area, and some spinning in front of packed grandstands. Many overtakes can be seen at this location due to engine differences and drivers' skills.

=== Wall of Champions ===
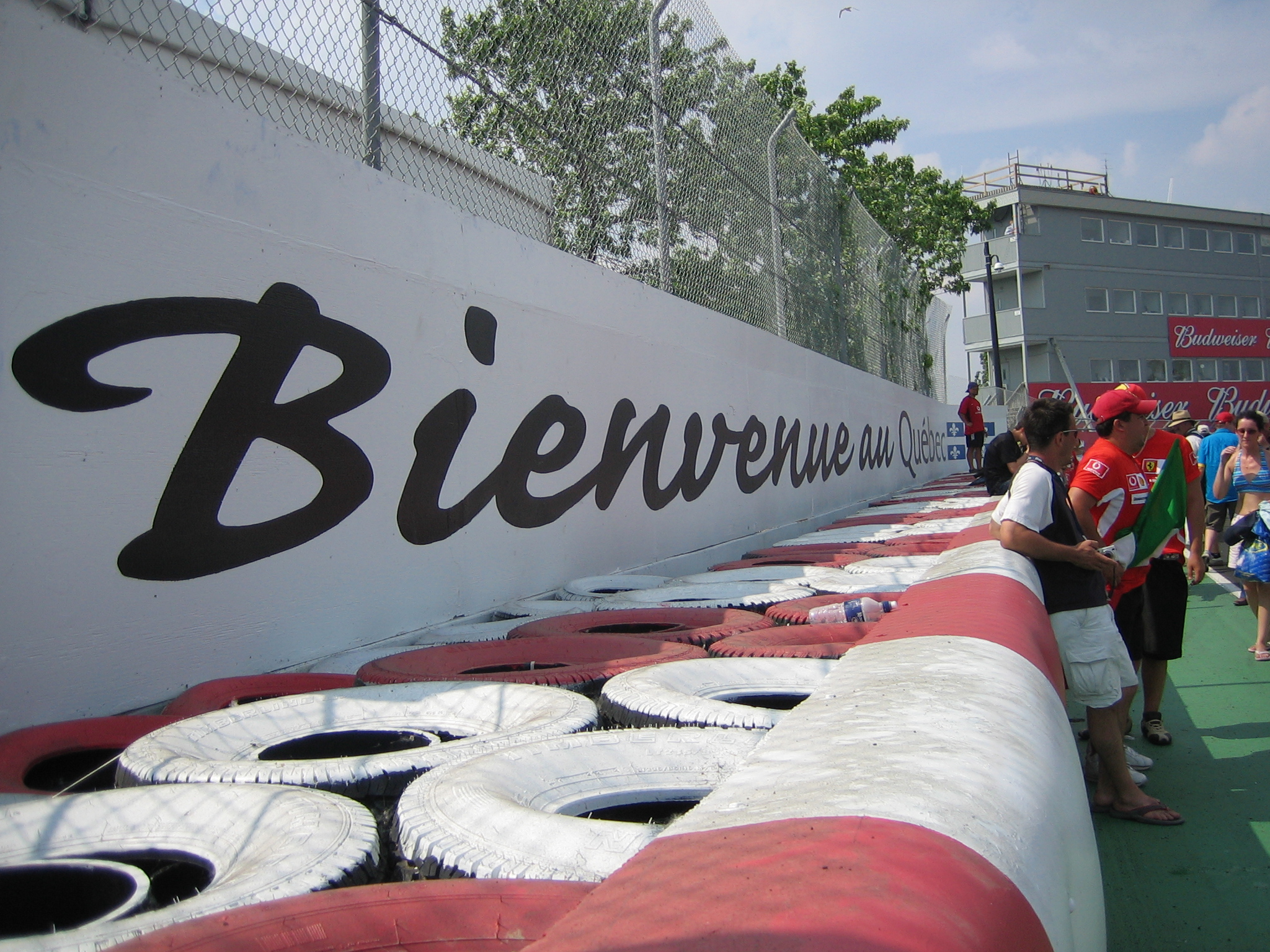
Bienvenue au Québec slogan on the Wall of Champions

Entering turns 12 & 13 drivers encounter one of the best passing zones, completing the long straight after the hairpin. Many duels have been seen exiting turn 12 with some race cars deciding to cut corner 13 into the run-off, with many going a bit 'too hot' apexing Turn 13 and not exiting intact. Turn 14 is dubbed the "Wall of Champions" after three former Drivers' World Champions found the outside wall in the 1999 race. In Formula 1 races, a car damaged after gracing the Wall of Champions brings out a Safety Car or VSC. The exit barrier is poignantly marked with advertising by Tourisme Québec ("Bonjour Québec"; “Bienvenue au Québec” in previous years) during the F1 event.

== Other circuit activities ==
As part of Parc Jean-Drapeau, the Circuit is open to visitors, between races, for walking, running, biking, in-line skating, and driving. During the few days of the Grand Prix, Notre Dame Island is one of the noisiest places in Montréal. Other times of the year, it is one of the quietest, being located in the middle of a river, on an island filled with greenery and animals, joggers and cyclists. However, on June 4, 2009, administration of Notre Dame Island has forbidden the access of competitive cyclists to the circuit, justifying this as a security measure to avoid the increasing injuries that occurred between year 2008 and 2009. A total of 27 injuries have been reported. The ban on cyclists has since been lifted due to protests.

== Layout history ==
Circuit Gilles Villeneuve layout history
Grand Prix Circuit (1978–1986)

Grand Prix Circuit (1988–1993)

Grand Prix Circuit (1994–1995)

Grand Prix Circuit (1996–2001)

Grand Prix Circuit (2002–present)

== Events ==
The events at Circuit Gilles Villeneuve are listed as:

Current

- May: Formula One Canadian Grand Prix, FIA Formula 2 Championship, F1 Academy

Future

- FIA Formula 3 Championship (2027)

Former

- Atlantic Championship (1978–1983, 1986, 1988–2006)
- Barber Pro Series (2002–2003)
- Canadian Superbike Championship (2004)
- Champ Car World Series
  - Grand Prix of Montreal (2002–2006)
- Ferrari Challenge North America (1996–1998, 2000–2008, 2010–2019, 2022–2024)
- Formula BMW USA (2004–2008)
- Grand Am Rolex Sports Car Series
  - Montreal 200 (2007–2012)
- IMSA GT3 Cup Challenge Canada (2012–2013, 2016–2019)
- NASCAR Canadian Tire Series
  - NAPA Autopro 100 (2007–2012)
- NASCAR Nationwide Series
  - NAPA Auto Parts 200 (2007–2012)
- Porsche Carrera Cup North America (2024–2025)
- Star Mazda Championship (2005–2006)
- Trans-Am Series (2005)
- SCCA Motorola Cup (1998)
- World Sportscar Championship
  - 480 km of Montreal (1990)

== Lap records ==
As the Circuit Gilles Villeneuve serves as host to different racing series, it is possible to directly compare different race series' lap times.

In 2006, the last time Champ Car and F1 ran on the same track, Formula One was 5 to 7 seconds faster than Champ Car. The fastest lap in the Formula One race was 1:15.841 by Kimi Räikkönen, while Sébastien Bourdais's fastest lap was 1:22.325 in the Champ Car race.

2007 NASCAR Busch Series driver Patrick Carpentier racing in the NAPA Auto Parts 200, posted a pole time of 1:42.086. The pole time at the 2012 NAPA Auto Parts 200 was 1:40.865 by Alex Tagliani.

The track record for the Rolex Sports Car Series is 1:32.620. The time was set by Scott Pruett driving for Chip Ganassi Racing in the Daytona Prototype class in 2010.

The fastest ever lap around the circuit was set by Sebastian Vettel with a time of 1:10.240 set in qualifying (Q3) for the 2019 Canadian Grand Prix. As this time was set during qualifying, it is not recognized as an official lap record. Lewis Hamilton set the previous lap record with a time of 1:11.459 during qualifying for the 2017 Canadian Grand Prix, earning him pole position. This was Hamilton's 65th pole position which put him level with Ayrton Senna in the F1 history books. After qualifying, Hamilton was awarded a helmet that belonged to his hero as a celebration. This helmet was sent by Senna's family and was awarded to an emotional Hamilton in front of the crowd.

As of May 2026, the fastest official race lap records at the Circuit Gilles Villeneuve are listed as:

Category	Time	Driver	Vehicle	Event
Grand Prix Circuit (2002–present): 4.361 km (2.710 mi)
Formula One	1:13.078	Valtteri Bottas	Mercedes AMG F1 W10 EQ Power+	2019 Canadian Grand Prix
CART	1:20.238	Dario Franchitti	Lola B02/00	2002 Molson Indy Montreal
Champ Car	1:20.840	Sébastien Bourdais	Lola B02/00	2004 Molson Indy Montreal
FIA F2	1:23.535	Alex Dunne	Dallara F2 2024	2026 Montreal Formula 2 round
Formula Atlantic	1:31.974	A. J. Allmendinger	Swift 014.a	2003 Montreal Formula Atlantic round
Daytona Prototype	1:32.620	Scott Pruett	Riley Mk XX	2010 Montreal 200
Ferrari Challenge	1:35.369	Dylan Medler	Ferrari 296 Challenge	2024 Montreal Ferrari Challenge North America round
Porsche Carrera Cup	1:35.988	Riley Dickinson	Porsche 911 (992 I) GT3 Cup	2025 Montreal Porsche Carrera Cup North America round
Trans-Am	1:37.340	Klaus Graf	Jaguar XKR	2005 Montréal Trans-Am round
Star Mazda	1:37.791	Ryan Justice	Star Formula Mazda 'Pro'	2006 Montreal Star Mazda Championship round
Formula 4	1:38.394	Chloe Chambers	Tatuus F4-T421	2025 Montreal F1 Academy round
GT2	1:39.353	Scott Russell	Chevrolet Corvette C6.R	2010 Montreal 200
GT	1:39.640	Jeff Segal	Ferrari 458 Italia Grand-Am	2012 Montreal 200
Barber Pro Series	1:40.095	Leonardo Maia	Reynard 98E	2003 Montreal Barber Pro round
Superbike	1:40.756	Pascal Picotte	Yamaha YZF-R1	2004 Montreal CSBK round
Formula BMW	1:45.224	Stefano Coletti	Mygale FB02	2006 Montreal Formula BMW USA round
F1600	1:51.599	Trenton Estep	Spectrum 014	2016 Montréal Canadian F1600 round
Grand Prix Circuit (1996–2001): 4.421 km (2.747 mi)
Formula One	1:17.205	Ralf Schumacher	Williams FW23	2001 Canadian Grand Prix
Formula Atlantic	1:36.484	Michael Valiante	Swift 008.a	2001 Montreal Formula Atlantic round
Ferrari Challenge	1:48.276	Lucio Nicolodi	Ferrari 360 Modena Challenge	2001 Montreal Ferrari Challenge North America round
F1600	1:53.244	Frederick Martel	AERO II	1998 Montréal Canadian F1600 round
Grand Prix Circuit (1994–1995): 4.450 km (2.765 mi)
Formula One	1:28.927	Michael Schumacher	Benetton B194	1994 Canadian Grand Prix
Formula Atlantic	1:38.745	Felipe Giaffone	Ralt RT41	1995 Montreal Formula Atlantic round
F1600	1:57.176	Mike Sauce	Swift DB1	1994 Montréal Canadian F1600 round
Grand Prix Circuit (1988–1993): 4.430 km (2.753 mi)
Formula One	1:21.500	Michael Schumacher	Benetton B193	1993 Canadian Grand Prix
Group C	1:28.725	Mauro Baldi	Mercedes-Benz C11	1990 480 km of Montreal
Formula Atlantic	1:38.031	J. O. Cunningham	Swift DB4	1989 Montreal Formula Atlantic round
Grand Prix Circuit (1978–1986): 4.410 km (2.740 mi)
Formula One	1:25.443	Nelson Piquet	Williams FW11	1986 Canadian Grand Prix
Formula Atlantic	1:39.443	Jeff Wood	March 79B	1979 Montreal Formula Atlantic round

== See also ==
- List of auto racing tracks in Canada
- Other Montreal area race tracks
  - Circuit ICAR
  - Circuit Mont-Tremblant
  - Sanair Super Speedway
