= Eurêka! Festival =

Montreal-based science festival provides opportunity to meet STEM professionals

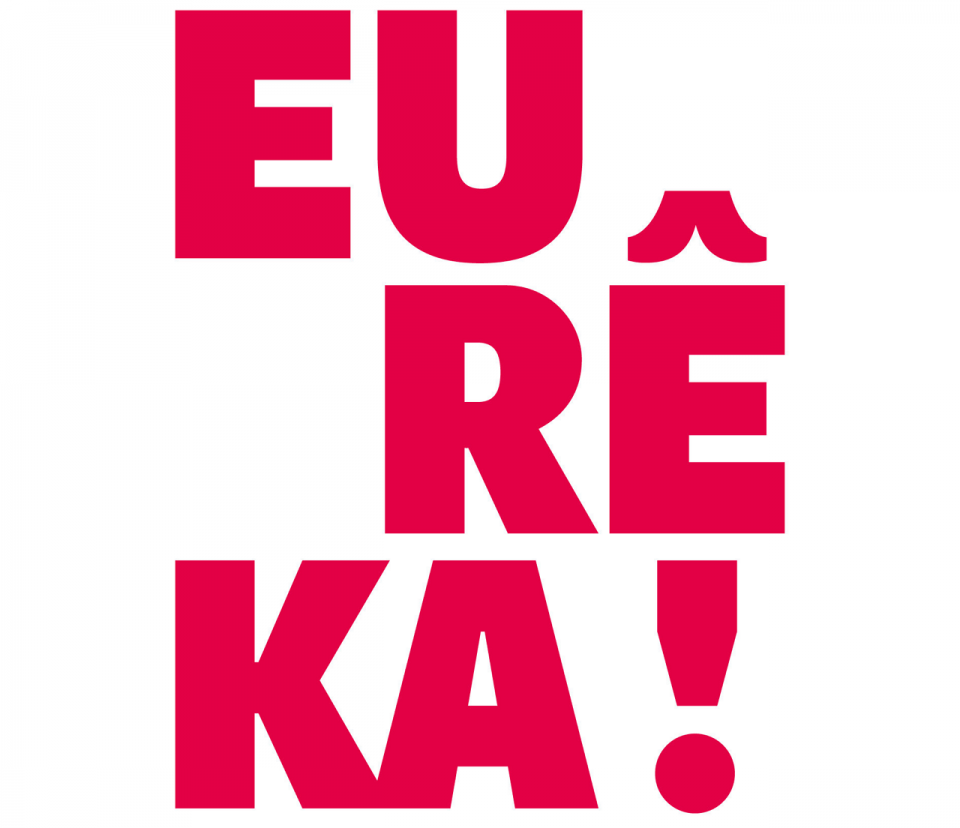

The Eurêka! Festival is a Montreal-based festival which aims to popularize science amongst young people and their families. The event is typically held outdoors, over a three-day period. Produced by L’île du savoir in collaboration with numerous partners, the Eurêka! Festival offers festivalgoers a wide variety of free interactive activities and the opportunity to meet and exchange with local professionals in STEM (science, technology, engineering and mathematics).

== Description ==
The first day of the Eurêka! Festival is dedicated to schoolkids and their teachers while the weekend is for families. The Eurêka! Festival shares and promotes scientific knowledge and aims to motivate the next generation to pursue studies and careers in STEM fields.

The Eureka! Festival also serves to mobilize Quebec’s science community on an annual basis, bringing together in one location some sixty organizations, universities, companies and institutions to offer over a hundred exploratory activities in a variety of fields. Shows, conferences, workshops, demonstrations, and short educational experiments create connections between scientists and the young public, encouraging kids to apply critical thinking and to have a better understanding of the world around them, all in a very festive atmosphere!

Topics covered at the Festival include climate change, technological innovations, mobility of the future, technological arts, aerospace, engineering, artificial intelligence, fauna and flora, health sciences and the human body, etc...

== History ==
In 2007, the Conférence Régionale des Élus (CRÉ) de Montréal, with joint funding from the Government of Quebec, established an extensive operation to promote science and technology to young people on the Island of Montreal. Out of this initiative was born the Eurêka! Festival.

From its very first edition that drew 43,000 festivalgoers, the Eurêka! Festival has named a local scientist as a spokesperson (Paul Houde in 2007). Since then, the annual event has been embraced by educators and families and has gained substantially in popularity. Initiatives such as the “Science Goes to School” contest and the “Elles-Innov” project, which supports and rewards young female innovators, are developed to extend the Eurêka! experience.

Since 2014, the Eurêka! Festival hosts a special edition of the science gameshow, Genial! in partnership with Télé-Québec.

L'île du savoir, a non-profit organization dedicated to designing projects to develop young people's interest in science and technology, has become the supporting organization for the Eurêka! Festival.

Year after year, the number of visitors has continued to increase, culminating with a record 142,000 visitors in 2019.

After the cancellation of the 2020 edition due to the COVID-19 pandemic, the Eurêka! Festival returned in 2021 with a hybrid edition, consisting of 2 different components: the Archipel virtuel, a fun and educational digital platform and a Eurêka! School Tour in Montreal schools. The 2022 in-person edition of the Eurêka! Festival will be held at Parc Jean-Drapeau.

Get ready to put SCIENCE IN MOTION from June 5 to 7 at Parc Jean-Drapeau and the Biosphère! Over three days, young people and families can explore the link between sports and science through FREE hands-on activities, workshops, and demos. Meet nearly 100 passionate scientists and athletes, test your ideas, and discover how science fuels movement and pushes both body and mind beyond their limits. Free for the whole family!

== Editions ==
Starting in 2013, each edition of the Eureka! Festival has focused on a theme that echoes current events in the field of science.

- 2007: 1st edition
- 2008: 2nd edition
- 2009: 3rd edition
- 2010: 4th edition
- 2011: 5th edition
- 2012: 6th edition
- 2013: 7th edition – Science and comedy
- 2014: 8th edition – Machines
- 2015: 9th edition – Play
- 2016: 10th edition – Exploits
- 2017: 11th edition – Dreams
- 2018: 12th edition – Robotics and Artificial Intelligence
- 2019: 13th edition – Transportation of the future
- 2020: 14th edition – cancelled due to COVID-19 pandemic
- 2021: 14th edition – Hybrid edition with 2 components: a digital platform and a School Tour
- 2022: 15th edition – Water in all its states
- 2023: 16th edition – Energy
- 2024: 17th edition – Planetary Health
- 2025: 18th edition – Creativity
- 2026: 19th edition – Science in motion

== Spokespersons ==
- Paul Houde – Inaugural edition, 2007
- Marc-Andé Coallier – 2008 to 2011
- Stéphane Bellavance –2012 to 2014
- Martin Carli –2015 to 2017
- Stéphane Bellavance & Martin Carli – spokesperson duo since 2018
- Stéphane Bellavance –2022

== Awards and recognition ==
- 2024 – Finalist of the Innovation-Relève Technoscience Award, from the Association des directeurs de recherche industrielle du Québec (ADRIQ)
- 2014 – Finalist for the ESTim award for an Innovative or Public/Parapublic Development Project, awarded by the East Montreal Chamber of Commerce
- 2013 – Best Program Award from the Canadian Association of Science Centres (CASC)
- 2012 – Finalist, Festivals and Tourism Events (budget over $1M), Quebec Tourism Awards
- 2010 – Finalist in the Best Festival category, Quebec Tourism Awards
- 2009 – Finalist in the Best Festival category, Quebec Tourism Awards
- 2008 – Technoscience Innovation Award from the Quebec Association for Industrial Research (ADRIQ)
