= Circuit Gilles Villeneuve Paddock =

Support building for the Canadian Grand Prix

Coordinates: 45.5013°N 73.5226°W

The Circuit Gilles Villeneuve Paddock, also known as L'Espace Paddock, is a support building for the Canadian Grand Prix at Parc Jean-Drapeau in Montreal. The Paddock is designed by the local Montreal firm Les Architectes FABG with lead architect Eric Gauthier for the Federation International d'Automobile (FIA) on Ile Notre-Dame, in Montreal, Quebec, Canada. It is named after Canadian F1 racer, Gilles Villeneuve who won his first Grand Prix race at the first race in Montreal. During the off season the track is open to the public and is used by cyclists for training. Ile Notre Dame is a man made island in the Saint Lawrence River in Montreal and was built for the 1967 World Expo. It is now home to the Paddock as well as a casino and the Olympic pool for rowing, canoeing and dragon boat training.

== History ==
The Canadian Grand Prix is an annual motorsports event that has been held every year since 1961 and has been a part of Formula 1 Racing since 1967. It was originally staged at Mosport in Bowmanville, Ontario before moving to Circuit Mont Tremblant in Quebec. It returned to Mosport in 1971 for safety reasons and then officially moved to its current location on Ile Notre Dame in 1978. Ile Notre Dame, built in 10 months out of 15 million tonnes of rock, was part of Expo 67, which was held to celebrate Canada's centennial. Ile Notre Dame, along with St. Helen's Island, located to the east, make-up Parc Jean-Drapeau. After hosting Expo 67, the island has since held NASCAR races, canoeing competitions as well as horticultural exhibitions.

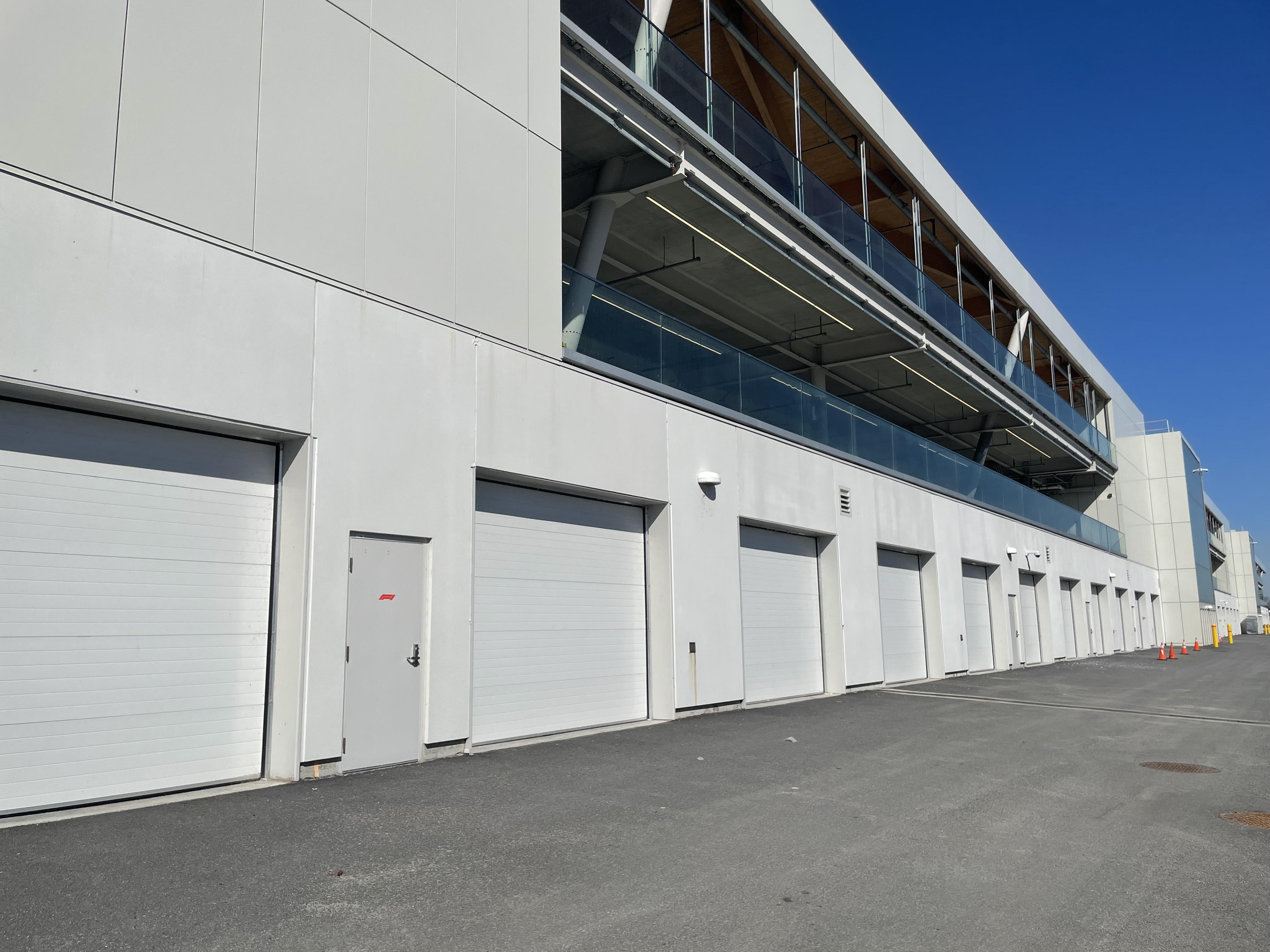

== Design ==
The Paddock is an elongated building with modern technology to fit the needs of the teams, organizers, media and spectators during a Formula 1 weekend. The space is used for the car garages where they build, store and do maintenance on the cars for the weekend on the ground floor. On the upper floor above the garages, with access from the glass elevator or stairs, is the multi-media and broadcast centre, operations centre and FIA office. Both the second and third level have the paddock club, lounges and terraces that are suitable to hold 9,800 people for the race weekend. The second storey covered terrace has an area of 34,615 ft2 (3,217m2) with the ability to hold 4,000 spectators, the third storey covered terrace with an area of 54,595 ft2 (5,075m2) with a 5,000 person capacity, and the third storey open green-roof terrace is 5,185 ft2 (485m2) having a maximum capacity of 800 people.

The concept of the Paddock design was to create a unique landmark for Formula 1 racing and the city as a whole while making it very accessible to everyone who visited. It was also important to limit costs in the long term by using sustainable materials and techniques throughout the building. There were challenges found by the FABG team while designing the Paddock as there was limited space on the island for the permanent structure making form and size limited. It was designed with removable partitions in the garage area and a new configuration for commentator areas and shareholder offices to work within these limits. Also from a construction perspective, there was only 10 months to construct the entire Paddock due to the time frame between Formula 1 weekends in Montreal, thus having to use local companies and prefabricate some parts of the building in advance.

== Construction & Sustainability ==
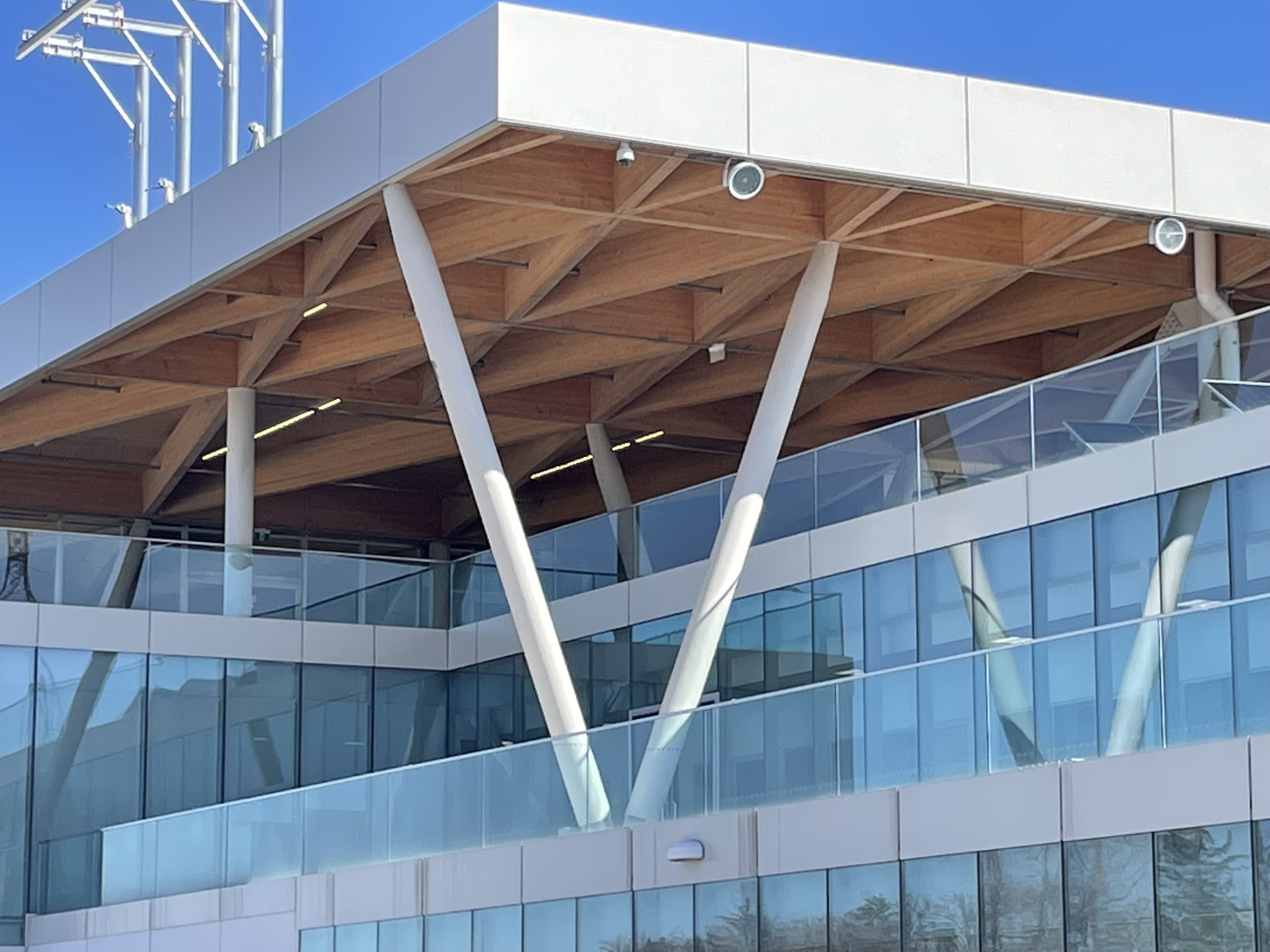

The intention of the roof structure design was to make a statement and to be unique, while being efficient and environmentally beneficial. The glued and cross-laminated timber (CLT) comes from northern Quebec, the trees that were used were cut in a certain way to optimize the fibre of the trees. Also used in the construction was precast concrete pieces which were locally created by a Quebec company along with the steel structure and curtain walls. The use of local materials and companies allowed for constant production and output throughout the short time frame of 10 months between the two Grand Prix events, including the winter months. The concrete panels, steel beams and columns, CLT wooden beams and panels, curtain walls and removable partitions were all prefabricated and brought to site for accelerated construction. The roof is 15,338ft2 (1,425m2), and is made of wood as a durable and renewable material which also works to capture CO_{2} emissions expelled from humans and cars. The amount of wood used will capture more than 1,000 tons of CO_{2} per year, along with the material already being carbon negative. Furthermore, if the Grand Prix is ever terminated the entire paddock can be dismantled and either reused or recycled. The use of solar photovoltaic panels create and store enough energy to be used for the entire building throughout the entire Grand Prix weekend. The new Paddock is now permanent as part of Montreal's commitment to the renewal agreement with the Canadian Grand Prix. In the past, the paddock at the Canadian Grand Prix was temporary and once the racing week was over, it would then be removed and not used until the following year, due in part to the limited space available on the island. With the new building, the Paddock for the Canadian Grand Prix is a more permanent structure and emphasizes the commitment of Montreal to the sport into the future.

== Awards ==
-2021 Gold Winner, Grand Prix du Design, Promotion in wood architecture

-2021 Gold Winner, Grand Prix du Design, Sports and recreation building

-2021 Winner, Structural Concept, CECOBOIS

-2020 Grand Prize of Excellence from the OAQ

-2020 Mention in innovation from the OAQ

-2020 FSC 2020 Leadership Award

-2018 Award of Excellence, Canadian Architect
