= Rubicon Riders =

Canadian dragon boat racing team

Rubicon Riders Dragon Boat Racing Team (MDBRC) is based in Montreal on the Olympic Basin located in Parc Jean-Drapeau. The RR was founded in 2011 as a competitive U23 team, the first its kind in Quebec. The boat is composed with a mixture of paddlers from Raging Beast (16), Autoboat Beast(3), Kamikaze(1), Boat Rockers (2) and Montreal Mix(2).

On May 25, 2011, the Rubicon Riders raced for the first time as a team in H2O Open, Montreal. On July 3, the crew clinched 3rd place (18-23 category) in DBC National Competition, Welland, Ontario and has officially qualified for the IDBF Hong Kong Club Crew Championship 2012!!!

== History ==
Founded in April 2011 with the merge of different paddlers aged from 18 to 23.

The name Rubicon Riders originated from the idiom "Crossing the Rubicon" which means to pass a point of no return.

== Competition Results ==
Rubicon Riders is a competitive team that participates in numerous competition year round around the Greater Montreal Region and Ontario.

=== H2O Open 2011 ===
	Time	Place
1000m	4:55:80	4th
500m	2:19:21	4th
200m	0:56:72	4th

=== Lachine KnockOut 2011 ===
- Qualifying 200m - Heat 1: Finished with a time of 00:51,05
- Semi-Final 3 - 200m: Finished with a time of 00:52,85
- Going into the Knockout against 3 other teams (MGDM2, Barbares and Paddle Demons)

	Time	Place
200m	0:51,18	3rd
200m	0:50,92	2nd
200m	0:51,68	2nd

=== Canadian National Competition 2011 ===
- Overall result: 3rd place in the U23 category

	Date	Time	Place
500m	July 1	2:10.09	2nd
2000m	July 1	9:54.74	5th
500m	July 2	2:16,00	4th
200m	July 3	0:49,73	3rd
200m	July 3	0:50,12	2nd

== Achievements ==
=== 2011 - 2012 season ===
- Bronze Medal Winner in Canadian National Championship, U23, Welland, Ontario

=== 2012 - 2013 season ===
- 1st Runner up in 2012 Club Crew World Championship, U23 Mixed 500m, Hong Kong, China
- 1st Runner up in 2012 Club Crew World Championship, U23 Mixed 200m, Hong Kong, China
- 2nd Runner up in 2012 Club Crew World Championship, U23 Open 500m, Hong Kong, China
- 2nd Runner up in 2012 Club Crew World Championship, U23 Open 200m, Hong Kong, China

== Members ==
Rubicon Riders are built from members of different teams whose age is or under 23 years old. Rubicon Riders recruits paddlers under 23 from all teams without discrimination.

=== 2011-2012 Season: First Season ===
Manager

Name	Team
Hassan Chahrour	Raging Beast
Gaétan Gagnon	Verdun Adrenaline

Coach

Name	Team
Gaétan Gagnon (Head)	Verdun Adrenaline
Janic Goyette (Assistant)	Adrenaline Women

Captain

Name	Team
Hassan Chahrour	Raging Beast

Steer | Drummer

Name	Team
Victor Trinh	AutoBoat Beast
Stephanie Tram Anh Tran	Raging Beast

Paddlers

Name	Team
Mietka Blémur	Raging Beast
Henry Michel Cantave	AutoBoat Beast
Martin Caron	Montreal Mix
Hassan Chahrour	Raging Beast
Michael Waltz Clerval	Raging Beast
Anna Czesak	AutoBoat Beast
Tiffany Foung	Raging Beast
Anita Hsieh	Raging Beast
Albert Lau	Montreal Mix
Daniel Le	Raging Beast
Henry Liu	Raging Beast
Jia Lun Liu	Raging Beast
Nilanka Mendis	Raging Beast
Willy Ngo	Raging Beast
Remy Savard	Kamikaze
Kin Fay Shek	Raging Beast
Vanessa Thermogène	Raging Beast
Isabelle Tran	Raging Beast
Stephanie Tran	Raging Beast
Stephanie Tram Anh Tran	Raging Beast
Nataly Trang	Phoenix Warriors / Let's Sink Together
Viviane Trinh	Boat Rockers
Pu Xu	Raging Beast

=== 2012-2013 Season: Second Season ===
Manager

Name	Team
Hassan Chahrour	Raging Beast
Gaétan Gagnon	Verdun Adrenaline

Coach

Name	Team
Gaétan Gagnon	Verdun Adrenaline

Captain

Name	Team
Hassan Chahrour	Raging Beast

Steer | Drummer

Name	Team
Victor Trinh	AutoBoat Beast
Calisa Ta	Raging Beast

Paddlers

Name	Team
Mietka Blémur	Raging Beast
Daniel Bruce	Raging Beast
Henry Michel Cantave	AutoBoat Beast
Hassan Chahrour	Raging Beast
Norris Chan	--
Michael Waltz Clerval	Raging Beast
Anna Czesak	AutoBoat Beast
Matthew Dean	Raging Beast
Vincent Fong-Magnan	Fonds de Cales
Tiffany Foung	Raging Beast
Anita Hsieh	Raging Beast
Janice Lai	Raging Beast
Albert Lau	--
Daniel Le	Raging Beast
Henry Liu	Raging Beast
Jia Lun Liu	Raging Beast
Nilanka Mendis	Raging Beast
Willy Ngo	Raging Beast
Kin Fay Shek	Raging Beast
Vanessa Thermogène	Raging Beast
Daniel Ta	Raging Beast
Fred Tran	Raging Beast
Isabelle Tran	Raging Beast
Stephanie Tran	Raging Beast
Stephanie Tram Anh Tran	Raging Beast
Danny Duarte Vasquez	Raging Beast
Pu Xu	Raging Beast
Qiwen Zhang	Raging Beast
