= Jacques Cartier Bridge =

Bridge in Quebec

Jacques Cartier Bridge Pont Jacques-Cartier
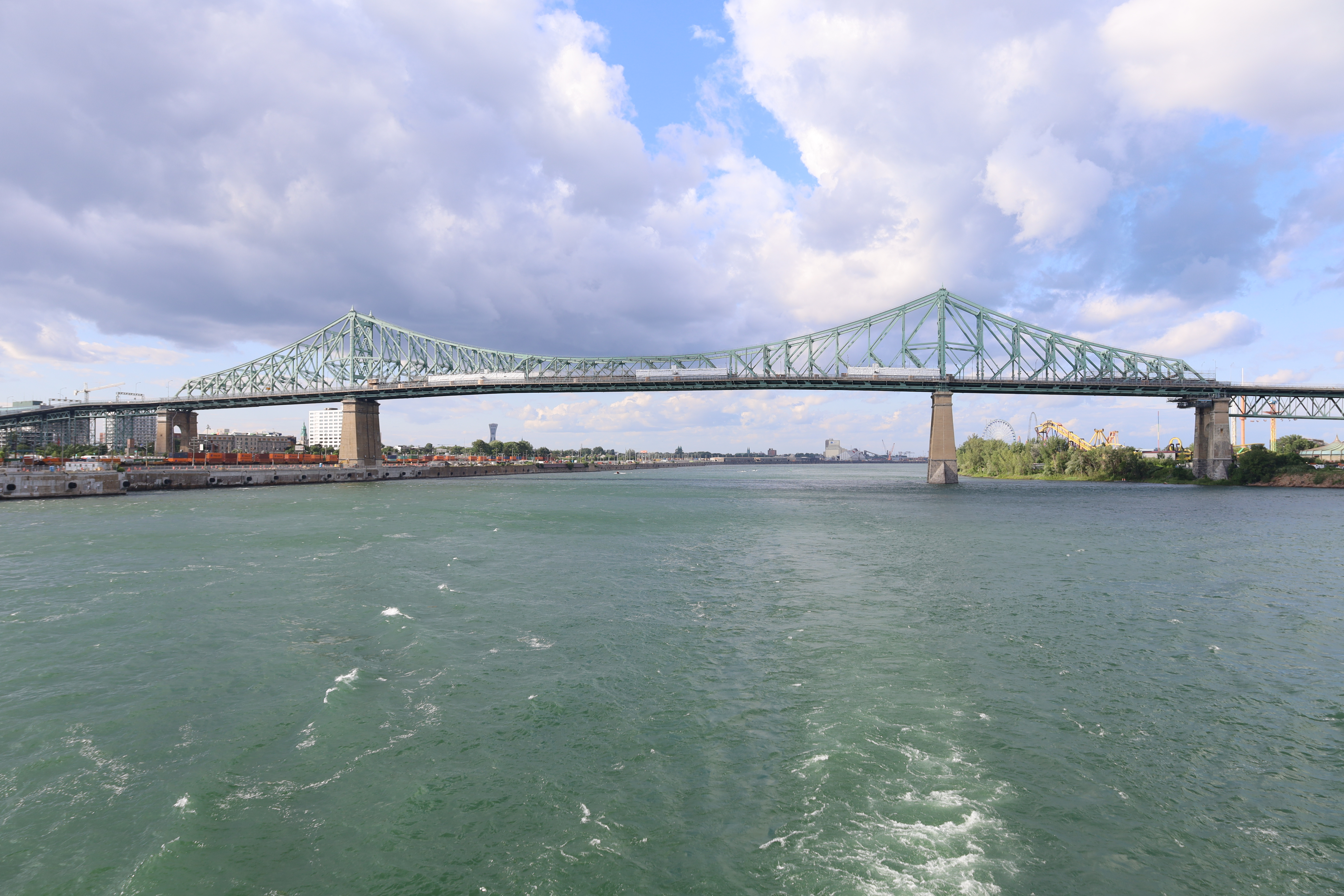
- The bridge in 2023
- Coordinates: 45°31′15″N 73°32′06″W
- Carries: 5 lanes of R-134
- Crosses: St. Lawrence River
- Locale: Longueuil and Montreal, Quebec, Canada
- Other name: Montreal Harbour Bridge (1930-1934)
- Owner: The Jacques Cartier and Champlain Bridges Inc.
- Maintained by: The Jacques Cartier and Champlain Bridges Inc.
- Website: pontjacquescartierbridge.ca/en/

Characteristics
- Design: Cantilever bridge
- Material: Steel
- Total length: 2,765 m (9,072 ft); 3,425.6 m (11,239 ft) (including approaches)
- Width: 23.1 m (76 ft)
- Height: 104 m (341 ft)
- Longest span: 334 m (1,096 ft)
- No. of spans: 40
- Clearance below: 47.2 m (155 ft) at mid-span
- No. of lanes: 5

History
- Designer: Philip Louis Pratley
- Constructed by: Dominion Bridge Company
- Construction start: May 26, 1925
- Construction cost: C$23 million
- Opened: May 14, 1930
- Inaugurated: May 24, 1930

Statistics
- Daily traffic: 83,500

Location
- Location in Montreal

The Jacques Cartier Bridge (French: pont Jacques-Cartier) is a steel truss cantilever bridge crossing the Saint Lawrence River from Montreal Island, Montreal, Quebec, to the south shore at Longueuil, Quebec, Canada. The bridge crosses Saint Helen's Island in the centre of the river, where offramps allow access to the Parc Jean-Drapeau and La Ronde amusement park.

Originally named the Montreal Harbour Bridge (pont du Havre), it was renamed in 1934 to commemorate the 400th anniversary of Jacques Cartier's first voyage up the St. Lawrence River.

The five-lane highway bridge is 3,425.6 m (11,239 ft) in length, including the approach viaducts.

The bridge is the third busiest bridge in Canada with approximately 35.8 million vehicle crossings annually, it is administered by the Jacques Cartier and Champlain Bridges Incorporated (JCCBI), a Canadian Crown Corporation. The same entity owns and operates the Samuel-de-Champlain Bridge, just a few kilometres upstream, which is the busiest in Canada.

== History ==
=== Planning ===
Discussions began as early as 1874 about the construction of a new bridge to alleviate the congestion on Victoria Bridge, which was then a rail-only bridge, the wintertime ice bridge and the ferries used to connect the city to its south shore. The decision to build the bridge was made official in 1924. The bridge was designed by engineer Philip Louis Pratley.

=== Construction ===
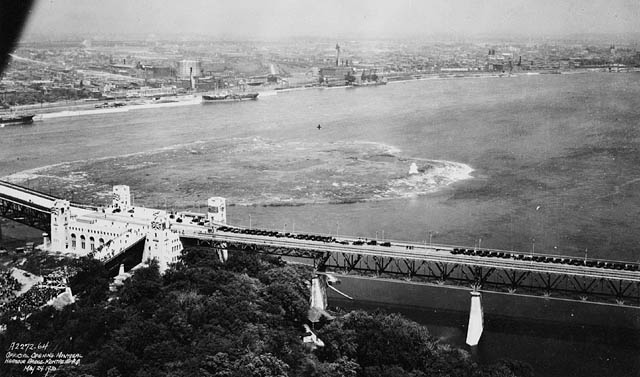
The inauguration of the Bridge on May 24, 1930.

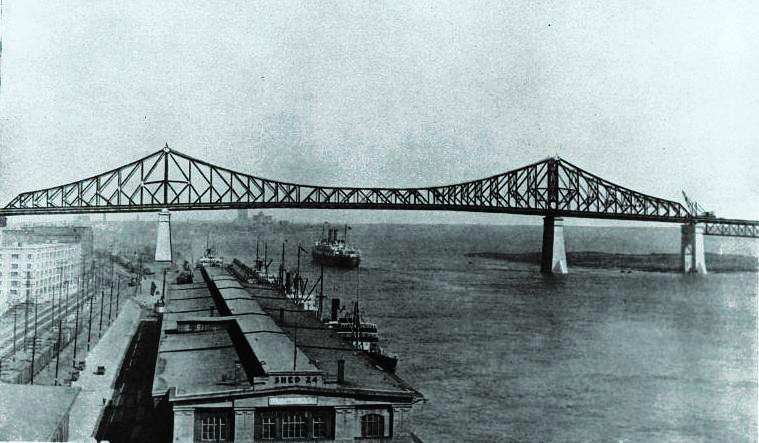
The Bridge seen in 1930.

Construction was undertaken by the Dominion Bridge Company starting in 1925. On August 9, 1926, the cornerstone was laid, integrated into the pillar at the corner of Notre Dame Street and Saint Antoine Street, opposite the Pied-du-Courant Prison. The cornerstone contains a capsule with 59 items reflecting the year in which construction began. The bridge was constructed of steel at a cost of C$23 million, and the work lasted two and a half years.

The groundbreaking was held on May 26, 1925. Construction began immediately and the cornerstone was laid on August 9, 1926, on Pillar No. 26. The superstructure was built between September 1926 and September 1929. 33,267 tons of steel were needed for its construction. The work was completed about a year and a half ahead of schedule, without disrupting river traffic.

It opened to traffic on May 14, 1930, however the inauguration ceremony took place a few days later, on May 24. The bridge was inaugurated as the "Harbour Bridge" but was renamed "Jacques Cartier Bridge" in 1934, following a petition from citizens to honour the French-Breton explorer who described and mapped the St. Lawrence River valley in 1534.

=== Modifications ===
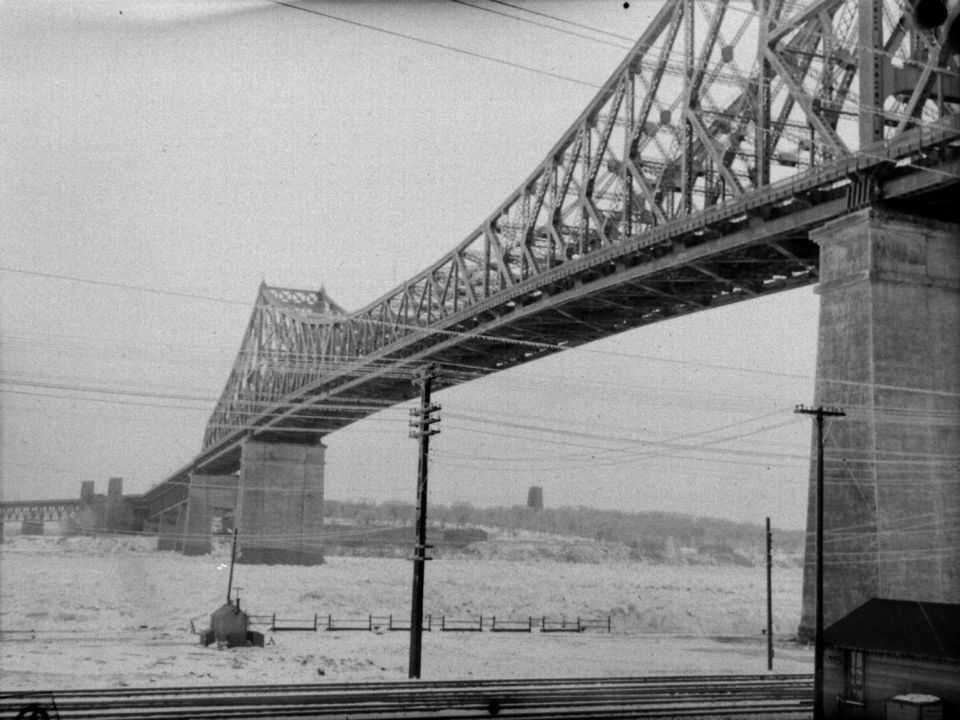
Bridge in 1948

The bridge was originally designed as a road, tramway, and pedestrian bridge. The original bridge had three lanes of road traffic and two sidewalks. Space in each direction was left free for the possible installation of two tramway lines. Tramway tracks were installed but never used. A parallel empty space used to exist to the right of the roadway in each direction, through which the bridge's girders could be seen.

The roadway was expanded by an additional traffic lane on the east side in 1956 and the west side in 1959 to include the space allocated to the tramway tracks, adding an extra lane of traffic in each direction and bringing the total capacity of the bridge to five lanes. The two sidewalks were outside the bridge proper.

To accommodate large ships using the new St. Lawrence Seaway, the span over the east channel of the river (the Warren truss) was raised an additional 80 feet (24.4 m) (to 120 feet or 36.6 metres) in 1957 and 1958. Traffic flow over the bridge was uninterrupted by this construction, through the installation of two Bailey bridges.

Originally, the bridge was constructed with only one ramp to Saint Helen's Island, located on the western side of the bridge. In 1961, a second ramp was built on the east side to prevent cars traveling toward Montreal from having to cross the path of those heading toward Longueuil in order to access St. Helen's Island, a major source of accidents.

During 2001 and 2002 the entire deck of the bridge was replaced. The sidewalks were also widened to a width of 8-foot (2.44 m), and the sidewalk on the western side of the bridge was made a bike path.

In 2004, the bridge authority installed a suicide prevention barrier. Until then the bridge saw an average of 10 suicides a year.

There are four 3-metre (9.8 ft) high finials, at the four high-points of the bridge, as architectural ornaments. Their shape resembles the Eiffel Tower without being a replica.

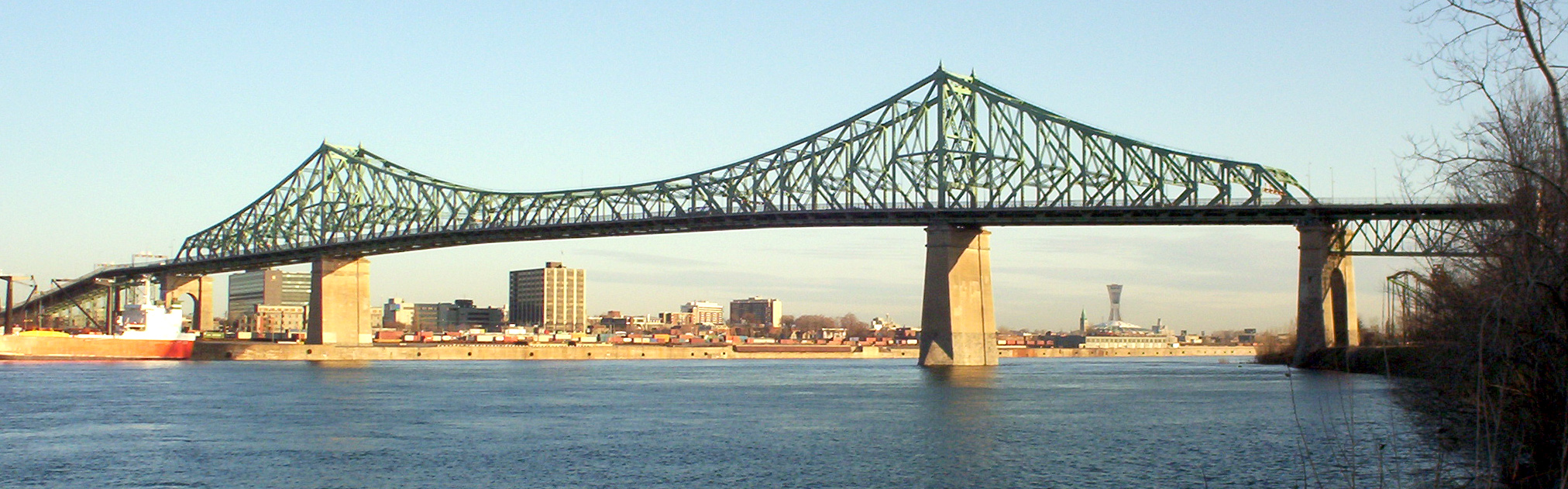
The Jacques Cartier Bridge as seen from Parc Jean-Drapeau.

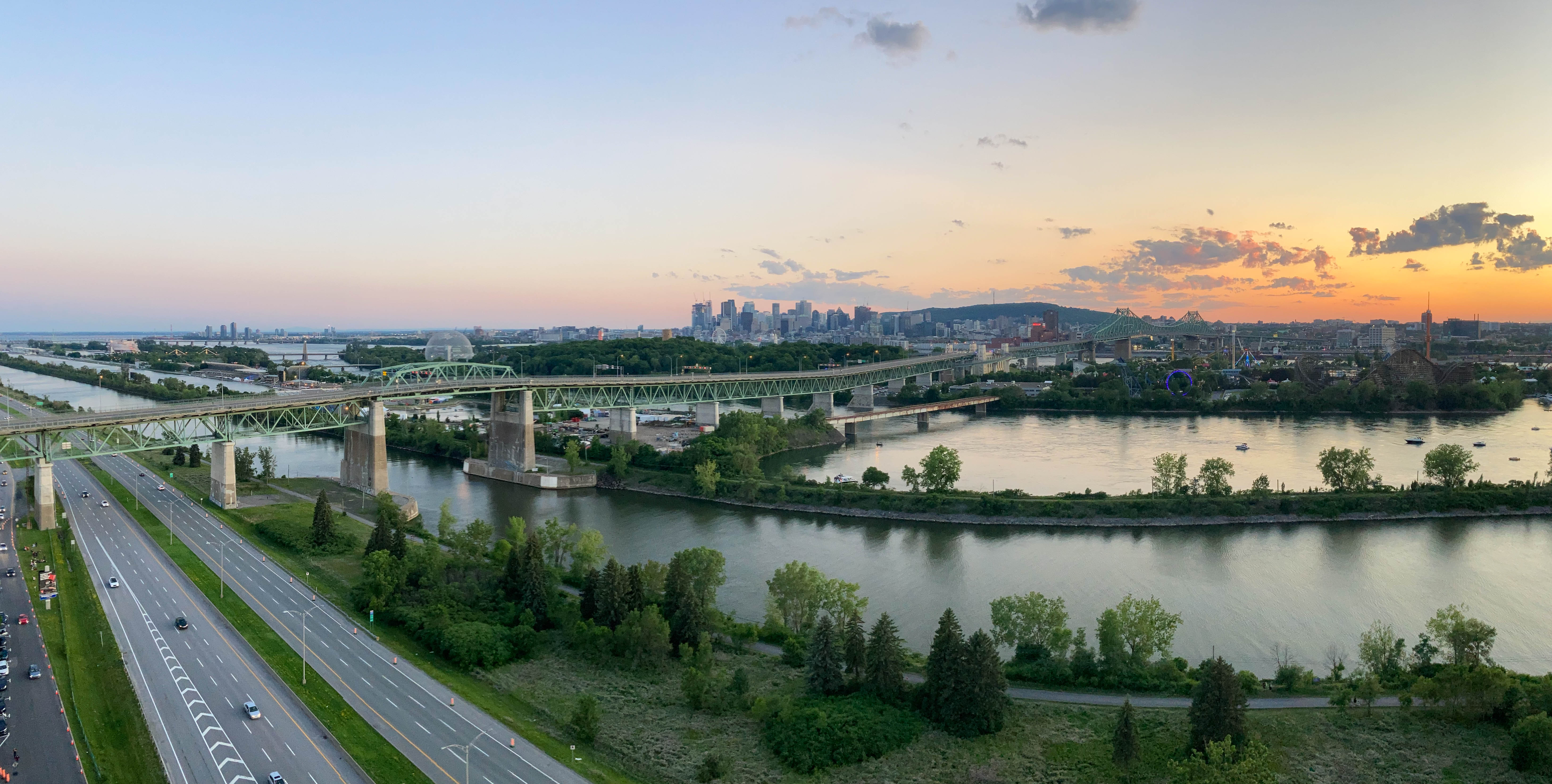
View of the entirety of the Jacques Cartier Bridge from its southern end, looking Northwest towards Montreal. The section of the bridge spanning the St-Lawrence Seaway, distinguishable by its Warren truss superstructure, is clearly visible on the left.

== Inspiration ==
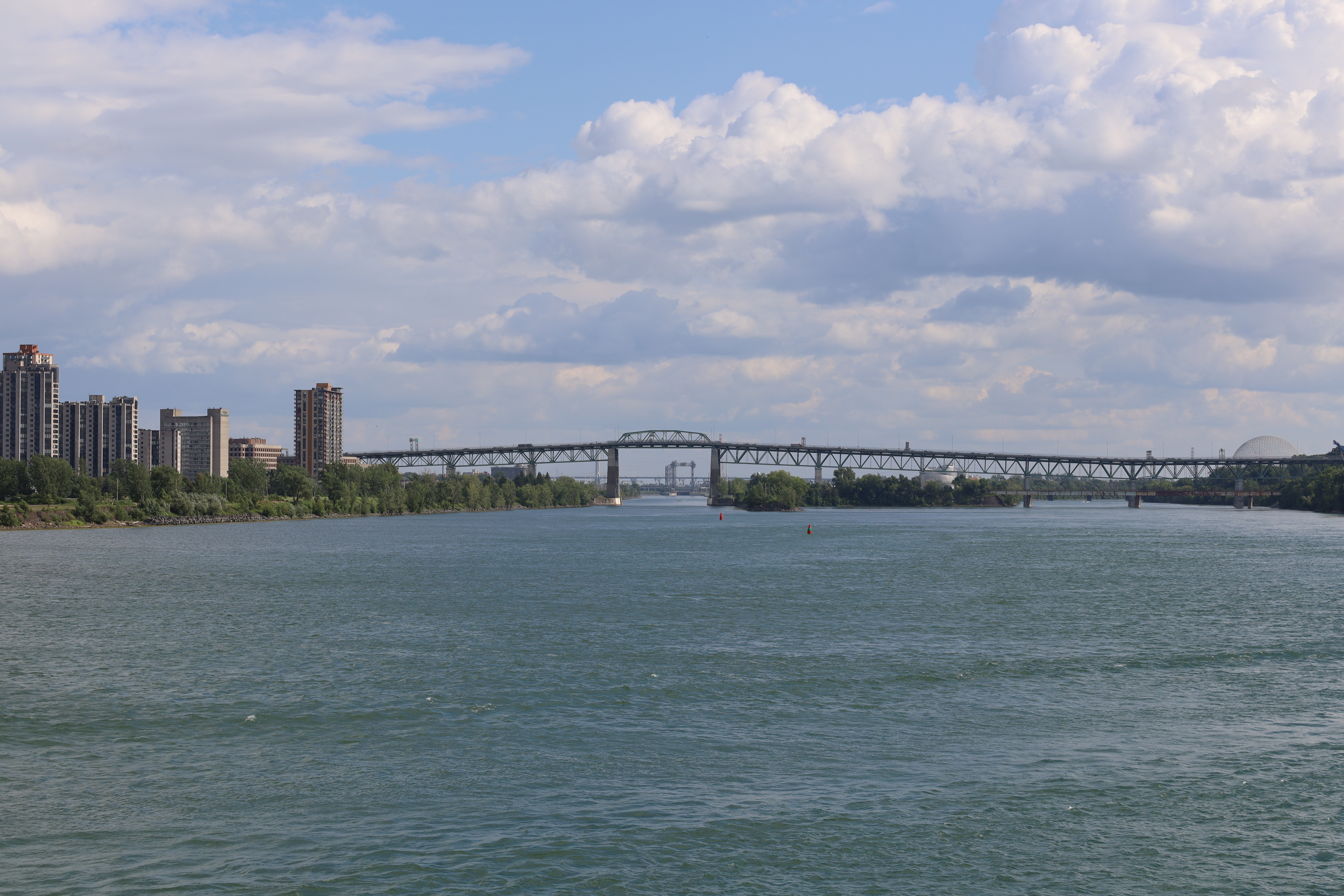
St. Lawrence Seaway span in 2023

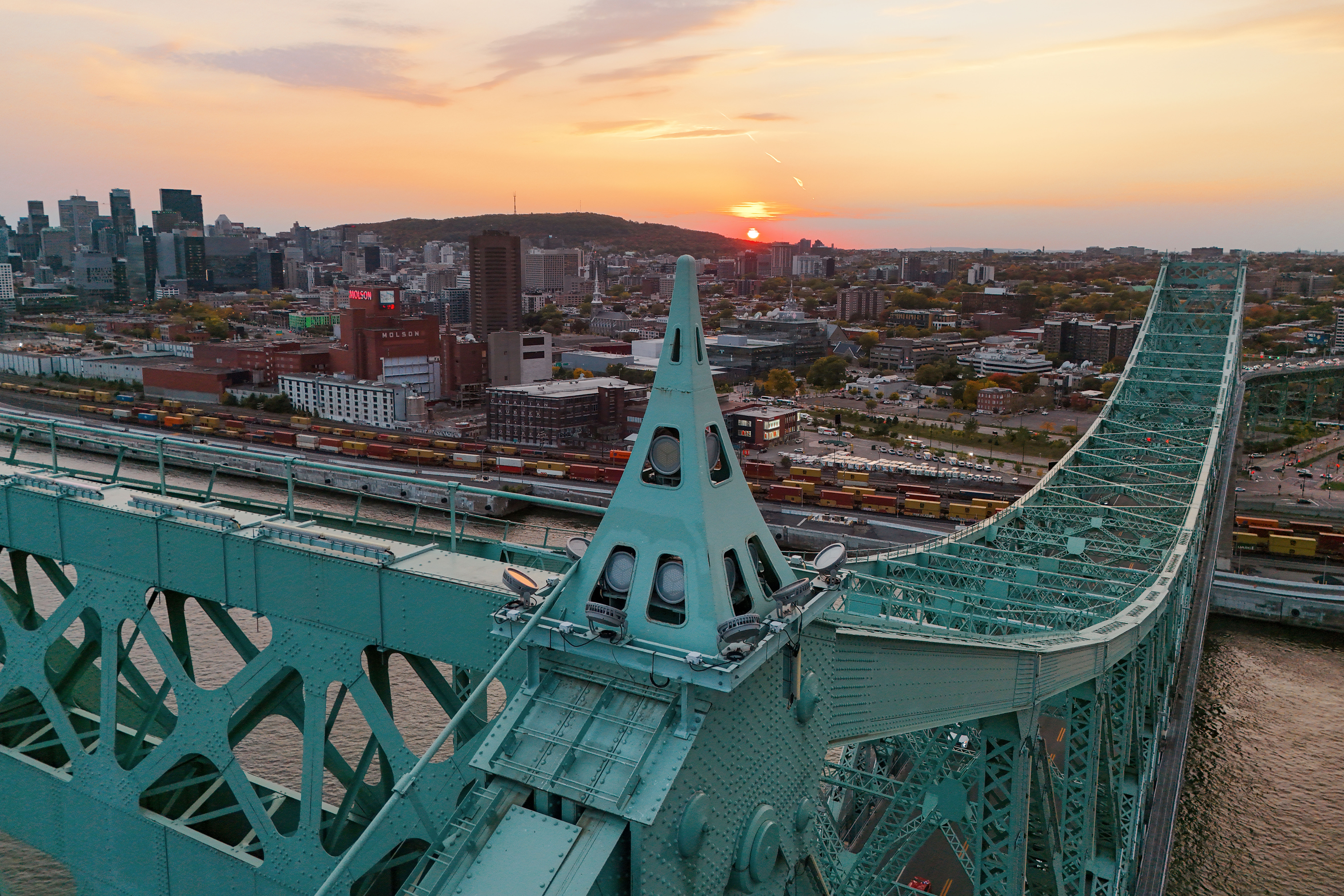
Eiffel Tower inspired finials atop the bridge towers

A bust of Jacques Cartier is located at the exit leading to Île Sainte-Hélène and was donated by France. The bridge follows the general design concept of the Quebec Bridge. It was, in turn, one of the design influences for the Story Bridge, in Brisbane, Australia, which was completed in 1940.

Its imposing steel structure of its main section most likely inspired the designers of J. C. Van Horne Bridge spanning the Restigouche River between Campbellton, New Brunswick and Pointe-à-la-Croix, Quebec. This bridge was not built until 1958.

== Toll ==
The structure was a toll bridge from its opening until 1962 and a toll plaza was located on the southern approach. The toll plaza area now houses the offices of the corporation that owns and operates the structure and the nearby Champlain Bridge. Tokens were issued for part of the period that tolls were collected. Toll booths were abolished in 1962.

The original toll rates were as follows:

- Pedestrian: 15¢
- Cyclist: 15¢
- Motorcyclist: 25¢
- Automobile (for the vehicle and its driver): 25¢
- Additional passenger: 15¢
- Bus: 80¢ to $1.00 (depending on class of bus)
- Truck: 25¢ to $1.50 (depending on the class of the truck)
- Oil tank: 60¢
- Animals: 3¢ to 15¢ per animal (depending on the species)
- Wheelbarrow: 15¢
- Free for children under 5 years old.

== "The crooked bridge" ==
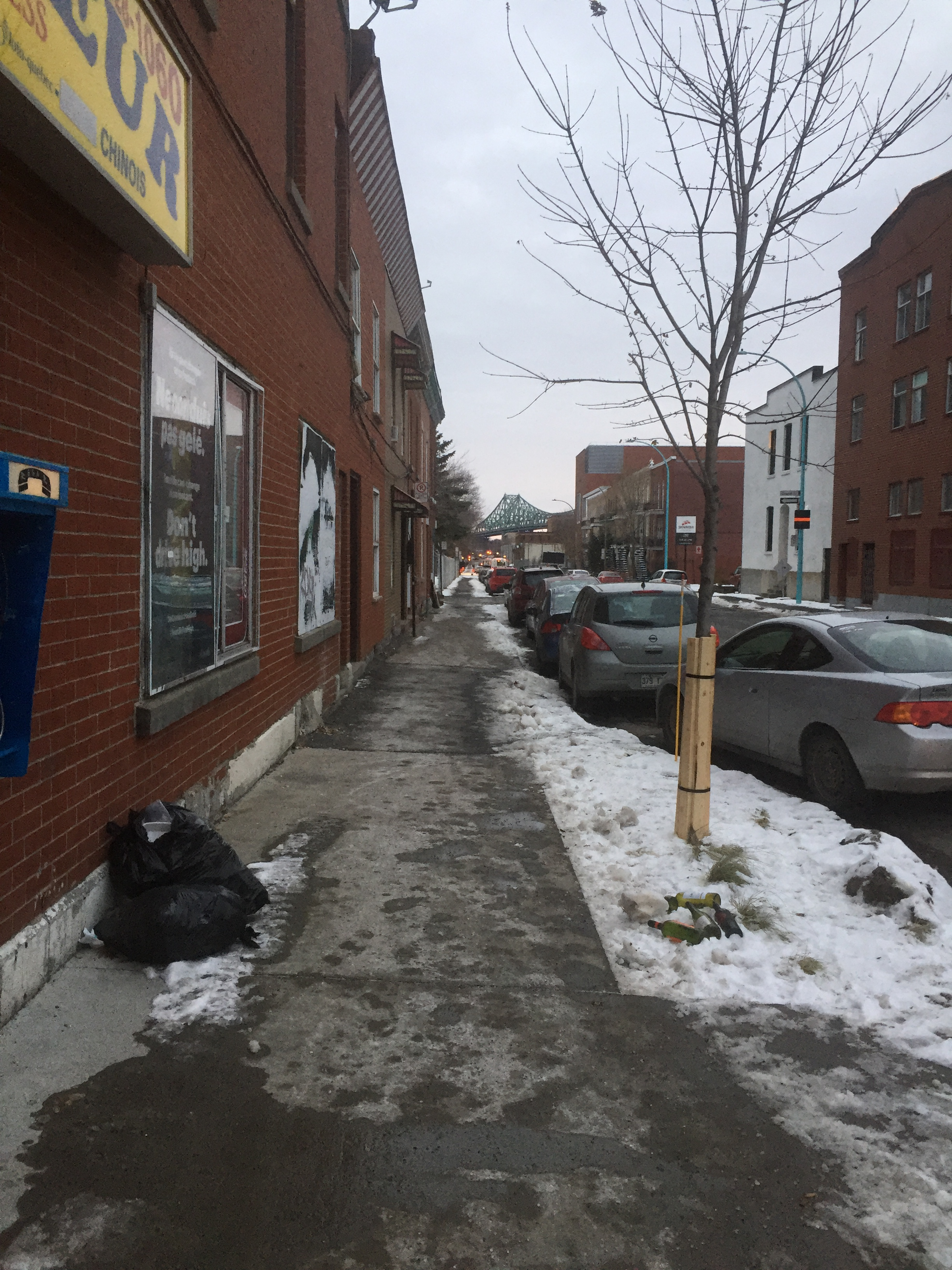
The Jacques Cartier Bridge visible from Ontario Street

From the beginning of its use, the Jacques Cartier Bridge was nicknamed "the crooked bridge" because of a curve at the entrance to Montreal. It was designed to avoid the land of soap factory-owner Hector Barsalou, who refused the amount the city offered him for his land.

Another curve in the middle of the bridge at the height of Île Sainte-Hélène is due to the positioning of the pillars. The pillars were built according to the direction of the stream of the river in a different axis of the streets to the North approach on the island of Montreal.

The existence of these curves has been a predominant factor in many accidents that have led to changes in signage on the bridge over the years.

== Traffic ==
The bridge has five traffic lanes, two of which are directional and one reversible for rush hour traffic and two sidewalks on each side for pedestrians and cyclists. It is also known for its famous Craig curve, a curve on the side of Montreal that once created many accidents because of its small radius and zero tilt. This deficiency was corrected in the early 2000s by raising the west side of the deck creating a slight tilt making it easier to take the curve.

The bridge is the continuation of Highway 134 and is connected to the multiplex formed by Highway 20 and the René-Lévesque Highway via an interchange. It continues on the South Shore in a short motorway section of Highway 134, which ends at an interchange with roads 112 and 116, before becoming boulevard Taschereau.

On the Island of Montreal, the bridge connects to De Lorimier Avenue East and Papineau Avenue West.

It is estimated that up to 115,000 vehicles use it per day, for an annual average of 34.7 million vehicles.

== Maintenance ==
Over the last twenty years, major ongoing renovation programs have been completed, including painting and deck replacement to preserve the integrity of the structure and to ensure a safe passage for users. In 2016, a rebuilding cycle was completed for almost all pillars.

JCCBI, the structure's responsible manager, is carrying out a structural steel reinforcement program dating back to 1920, in order to extend the life span of the bridge. Specifically, some steel ribs and reinforcing plates have been replaced and reinforced.

== Disruptions ==
This bridge has been shut down several times due to several protesters who have individually climbed on the superstructure of the bridge or on a sign in the Longueuil side of the bridge. Two of them were from the Fathers for Justice group, while a third claimed he was part of the group. Recently, a man wearing a Canadian flag climbed the structure of the bridge. Most of the protests led to massive traffic congestion during rush hour. Recently, the pedestrian paths were modified with the installation of round metal fences all around in both directions, to prevent climbing of the superstructure and discourage potential suicide jumpers, the two main problems associated with pedestrian traffic on the bridge.

== Living Connections lighting ==
To mark both the 150th anniversary of Canada and the 375th anniversary of Montreal, the bridge was refitted in 2017 with new decorative lights. The project, "Living Connections" was designed and installed over a period of 3 years by Montreal-based Moment Factory in collaboration with other local partners (Réalisations Inc. Montreal, Ambiances Design Productions, ATOMIC3, Éclairage Public/ Ombrages, Lucion Média and UDO Design). Project management was provided by JCCBI. The system, which allows for varying colors and animation, is scheduled to remain active until 2027. The interior lighting network changes with the passing of seasons, while the exterior lighting network uses big data, translated in real time to feed LED lighting networks on the outsides of the bridge superstructure, making the structure the first "connected" bridge in the world. Réalisations Inc. Montreal is responsible for the idea of using big data as a modulator of the bridge lighting program, as well as the design and production of the custom software and training of on-site operators to bring this concept to life.

Fifty-three types of data pertaining to Montreal, across eleven categories, are tracked to feed the bridge's lighting systems, included but not limited to; weather, traffic, noise and activity on social media. The bridge is then invaded by luminous movements in the colours of the most discussed topics of the day by the Montreal media: society (red), environment (green), technology (light blue), business (gray), sports (blue), institutions (pink), culture (purple). The systems track this data using physical capture systems such as sensors and cameras as well as through hashtags and keywords on online platforms. More information on how data is interpreted and expressed in light, and the systems used to do so, can be found on the Réalisations website.

The bridge is part of the cycle of the seasons thanks to a chromatic calendar of 365 colours. Day after day, it is transformed, progressively from the spring energizing green, to the radiant summer orange, to the voluptuous autumn red and the icy blue of winter. The bridge also gives the pulse of Montreal life in real time. The intensity, speed and density of light movements are fueled by the mention of Montreal on Twitter.

The first lighting up of the bridge occurred on May 17, 2017, the same day associated with the founding of Montreal in 1642 and officially kicking off the festivities for the 375th anniversary.

=== Lighting of the Jacques Cartier Bridge in Numbers ===
- 15,650 tonnes: weight of bridge superstructure
- 10,000 fastening systems: to secure the luminaires on the steel supports fixed to the bridge
- 10.4 km: cabling needed for bridge lighting for data transfer and power supply
- 2,807 luminaires: a combination of projectors and strips bathes the steel superstructure in colourful ambience light that changes in accordance to the effervescence of the metropolis.
- More than 200 participants: from all professional backgrounds contributed to the project (creatives, engineers, designers, project managers, programmers, rope access technicians, electricians, steel erectors, traffic officers, etc.).

== Gallery ==
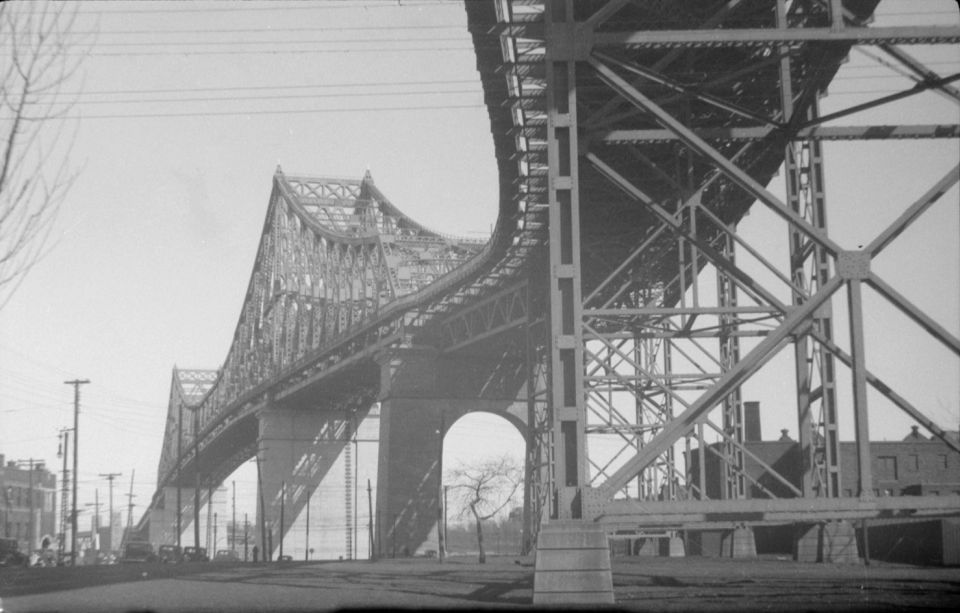
Jacques-Cartier Bridge, 1937

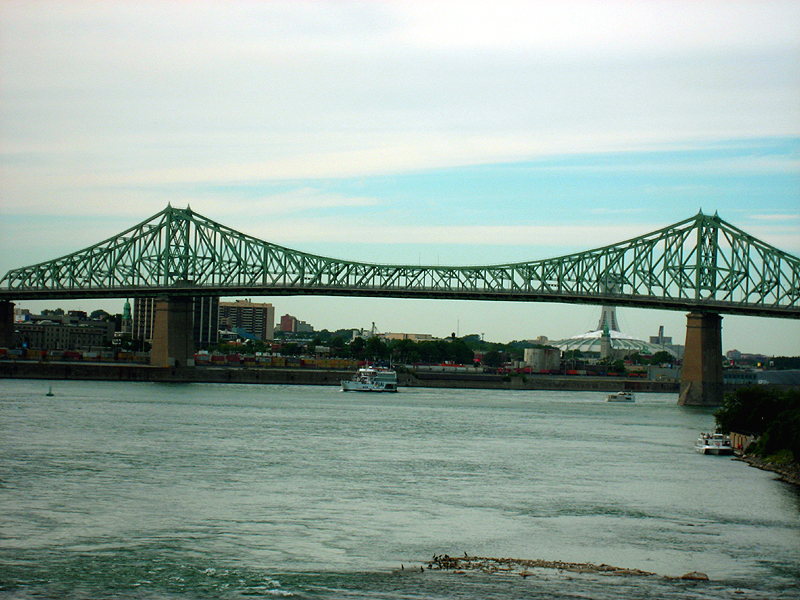
Jacques-Cartier Bridge from the Concorde Bridge

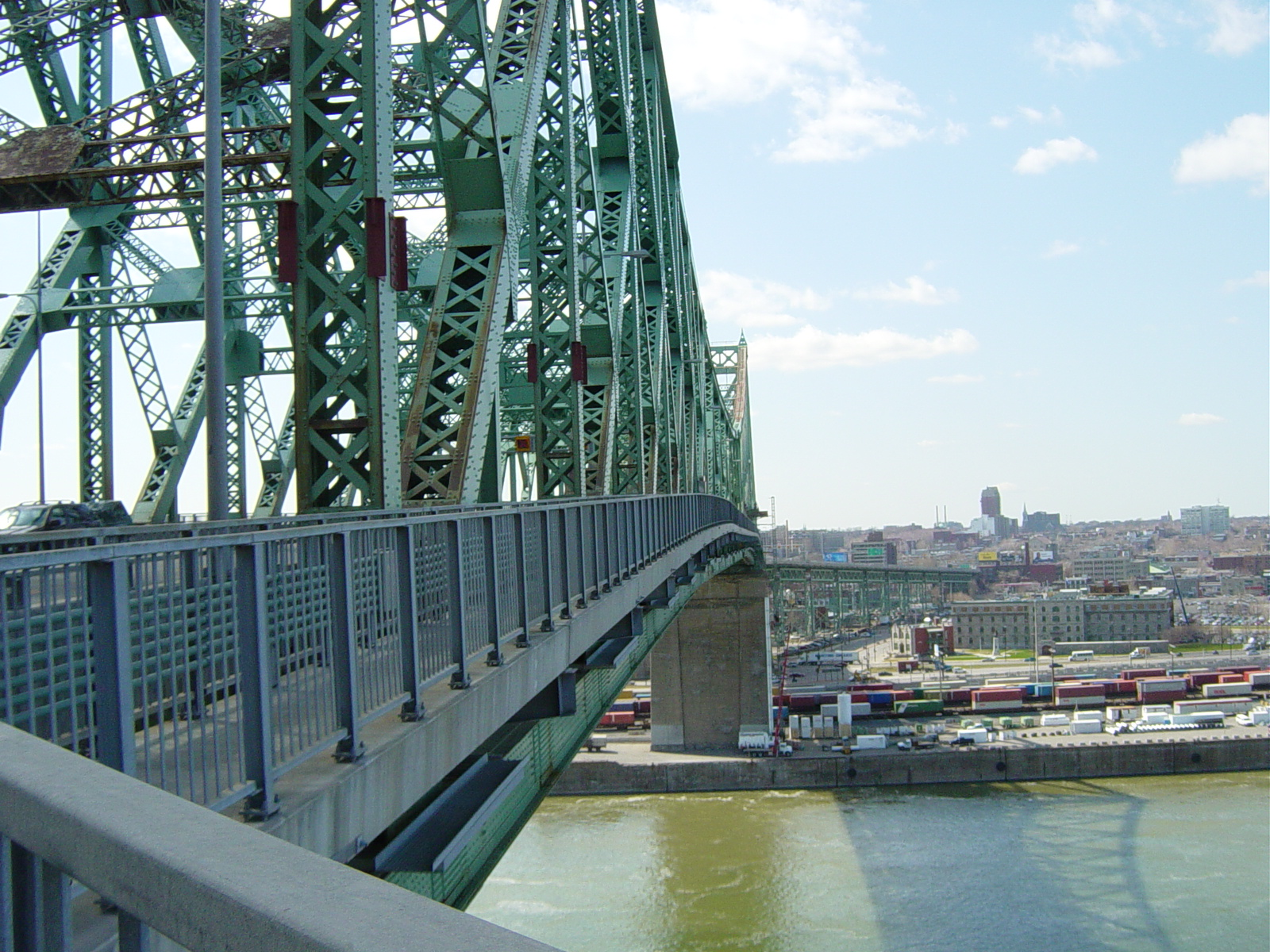
View from the bridge, before the suicide prevention barriers were installed

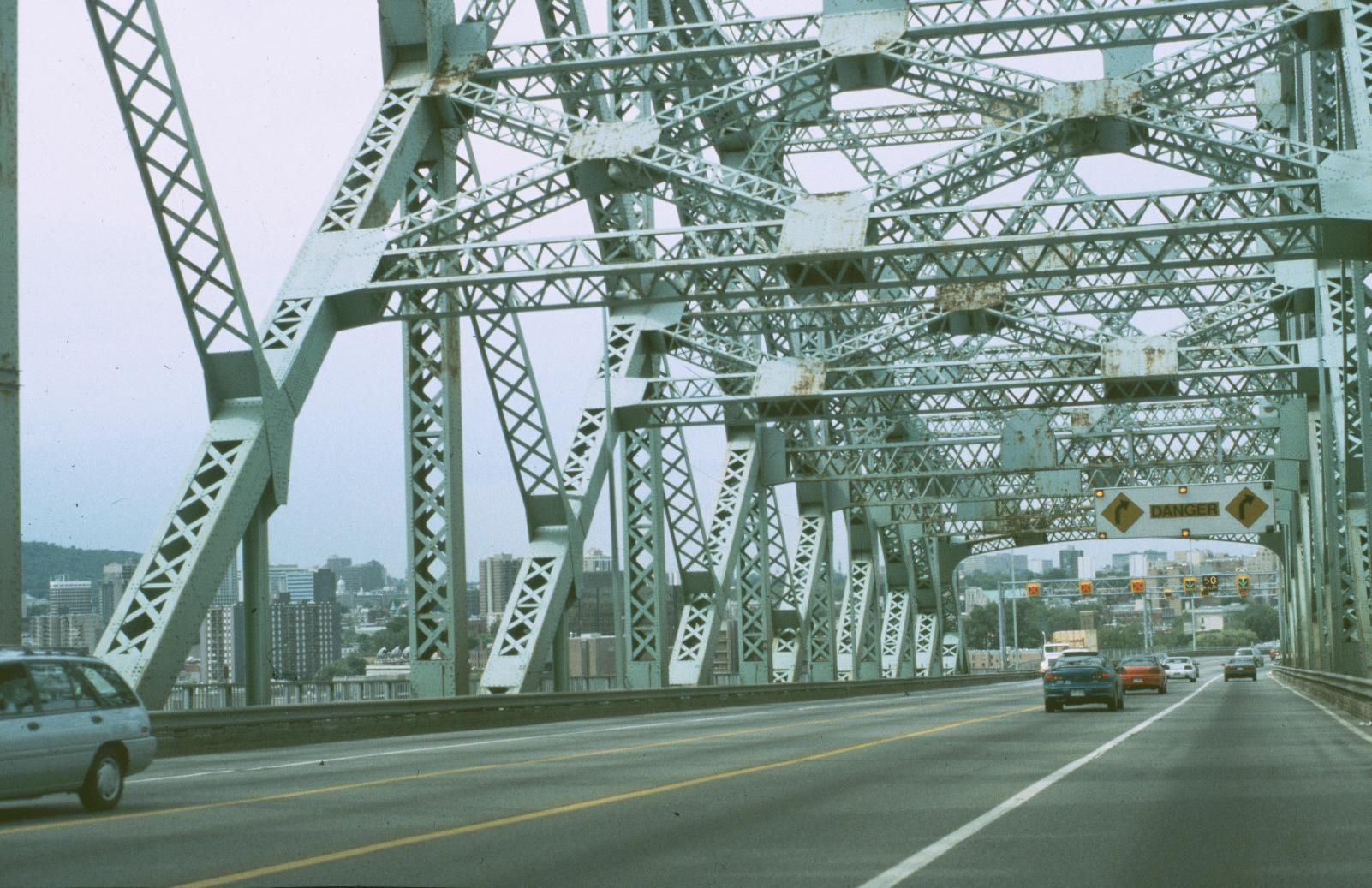
Driving on the Jacques-Cartier bridge

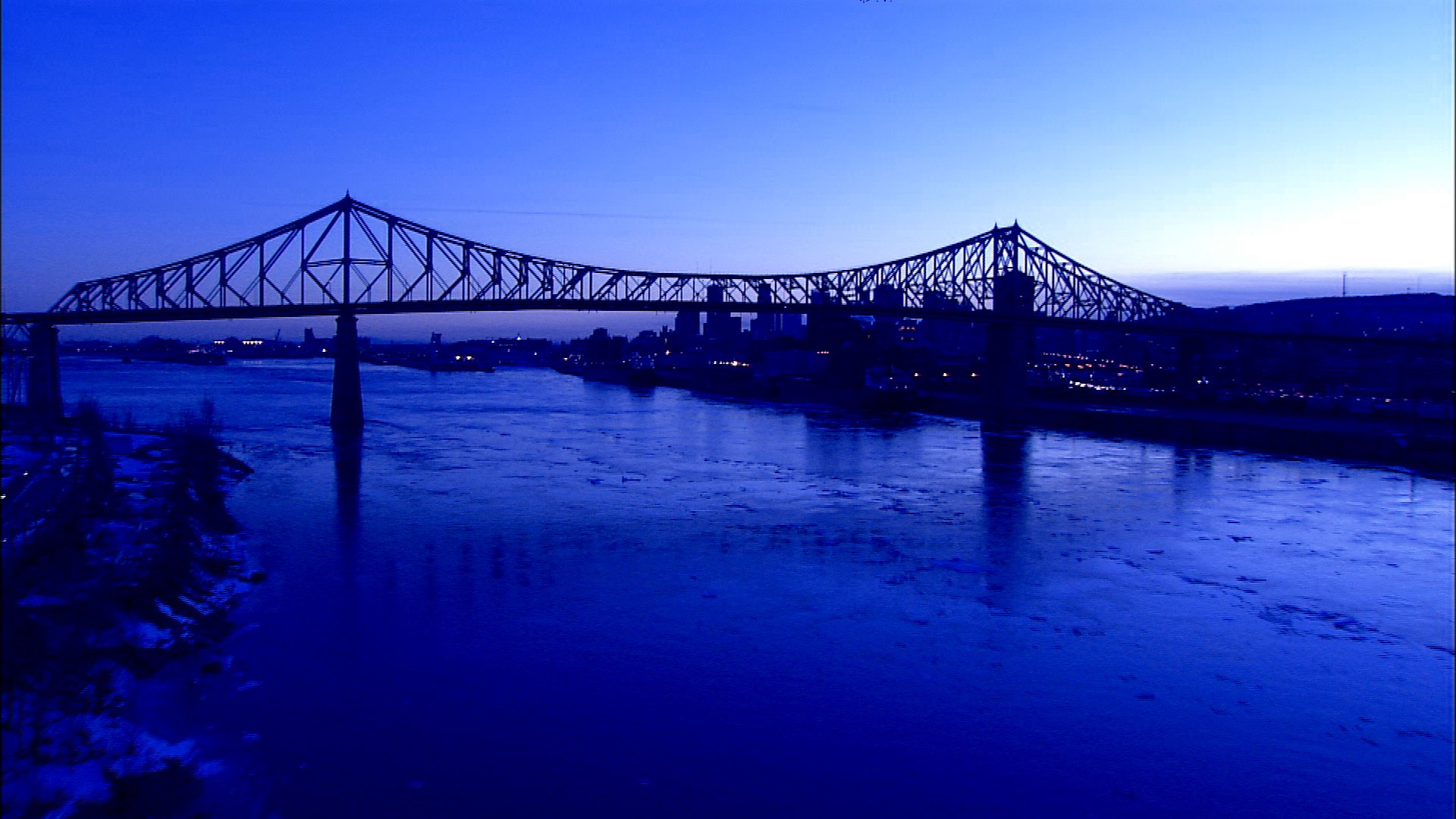
Jacques Cartier Bridge at dusk

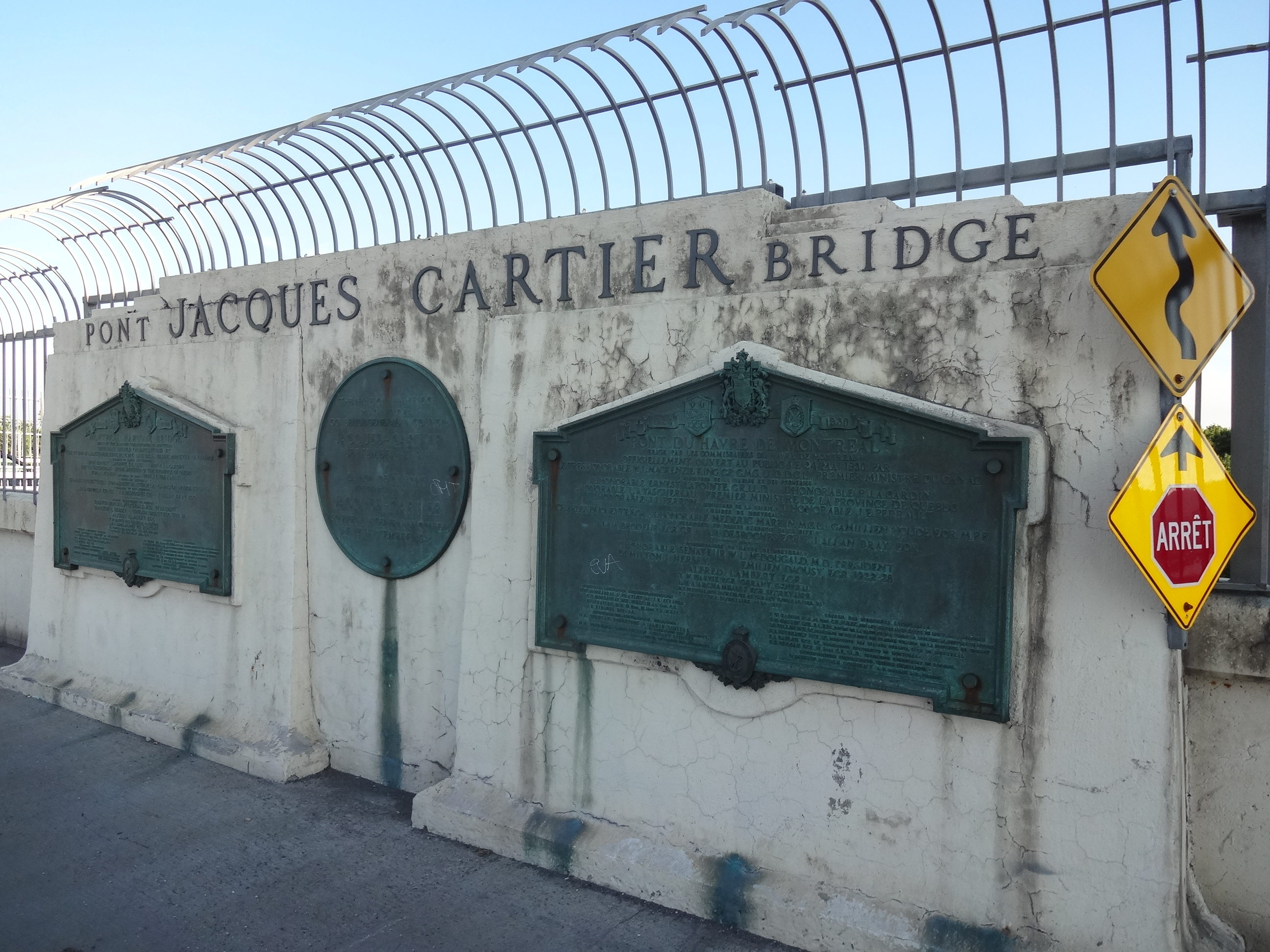
Signs inside the bridge

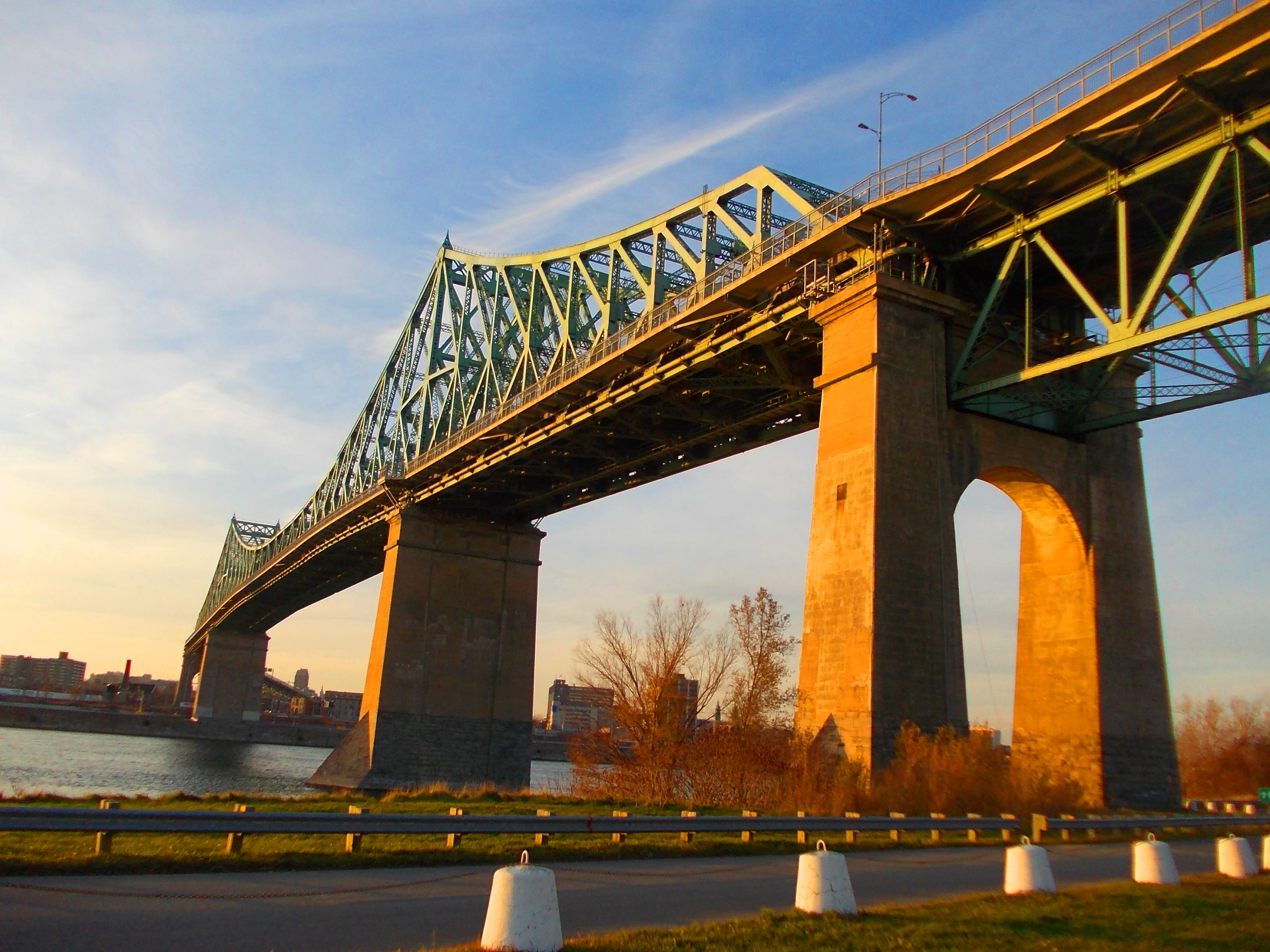
Jacques Cartier Bridge

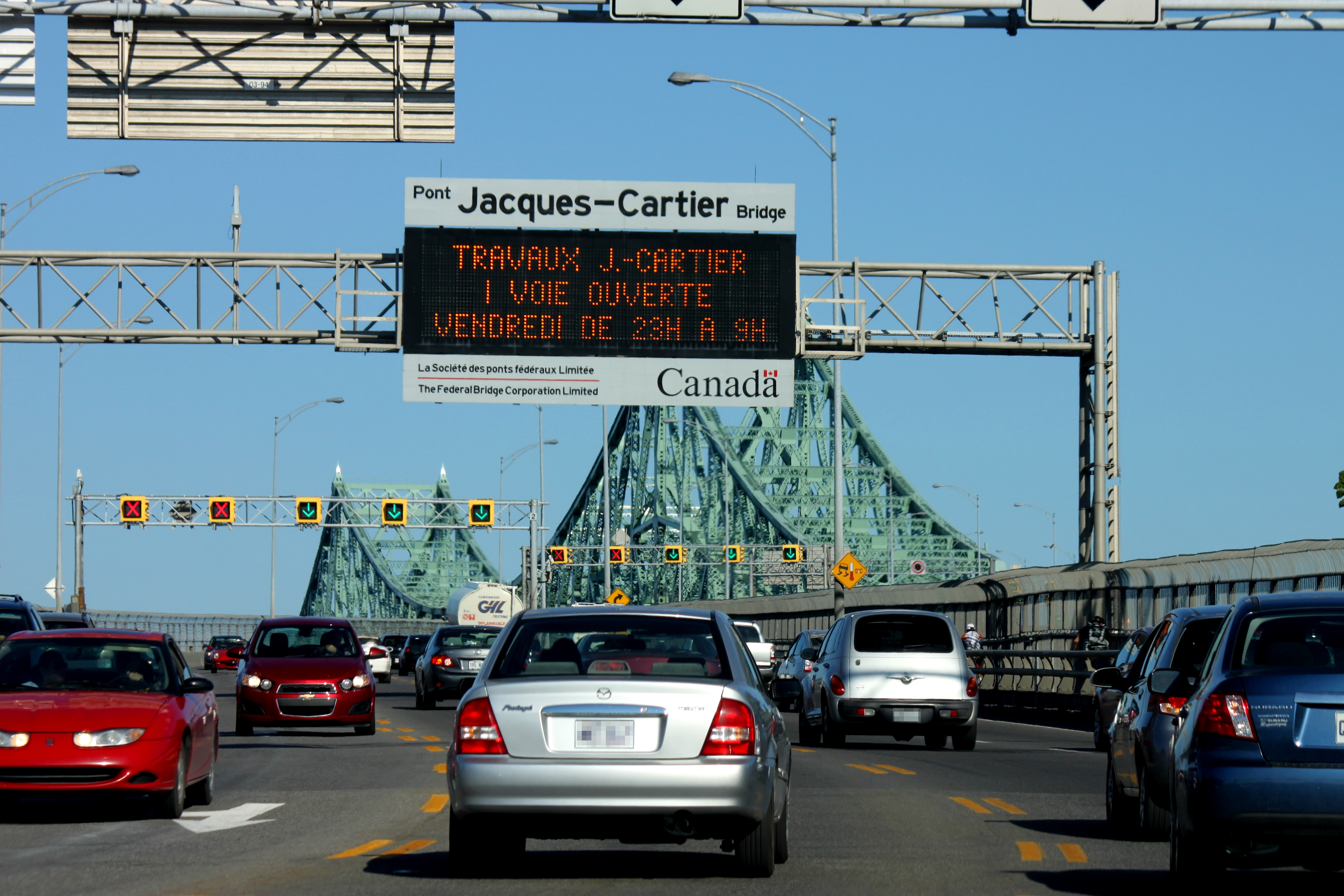
West side view of the Jaques Cartier Bridge

== See also ==
- List of bridges in Canada
- Suicide bridge
- Story Bridge
