= Philip Louis Pratley =

Canadian civil engineer (1884–1958)

Philip Louis Pratley (December 4, 1884 – August 1, 1958) was an English-born Canadian bridge designer.

He was born in Liverpool and received a BSc and BEng from the University of Liverpool. Pratley then apprenticed with Francis Morton & Co. Ltd. in Garston, Lancashire. In 1906, he moved to Canada, first working for the Locomotive and Machine Company and then for the Dominion Bridge Company, both based in Montreal. In 1908, he earned a MEng from the University of Liverpool. In 1909, Pratley played an important role in the planning of the Quebec Bridge over the Saint Lawrence River. He went on to work with the Saint Lawrence bridge company in the construction of the Quebec bridge. He was also involved in the construction of the Boucanée River Viaduct (1913) and the Saint John Highway Arch Bridge (1915) in New Brunswick. In 1920, he conducted a review of the bridges on the Grand Trunk Railway on behalf of the Canadian government. The following year, Pratley formed the consulting company Monsarrat & Pratley in partnership with Charles Monsarrat. The company was responsible for the design and supervision of construction of the Jacques Cartier Bridge at Montreal, the Île d'Orléans Bridge at Quebec City, the Lions Gate Bridge at Vancouver, the Angus L. Macdonald Bridge at Halifax, Nova Scotia and the Burlington Bay Skyway Bridge near Hamilton, Ontario.

At the time of his death, Pratley was working on the Champlain Bridge at Montreal and the South Channel Bridge of Three Nations Crossing at Cornwall, Ontario. His son, H. Hugh L. Pratley, was also a bridge designer, whose work included collaborating with his father on the Angus L. Macdonald Bridge, and completing the Champlain Bridge.

In 2005, Pratley was designated a Person of National Historic Significance by the government of Canada. A commemorative plaque has been placed at the northern approach to the Jacques Cartier Bridge in Montreal.
