= Île d'Orléans Bridge =

Bridge in Quebec City and Île d'Orléans, Quebec

Orleans Island Bridge Pont de l'Île d'Orléans
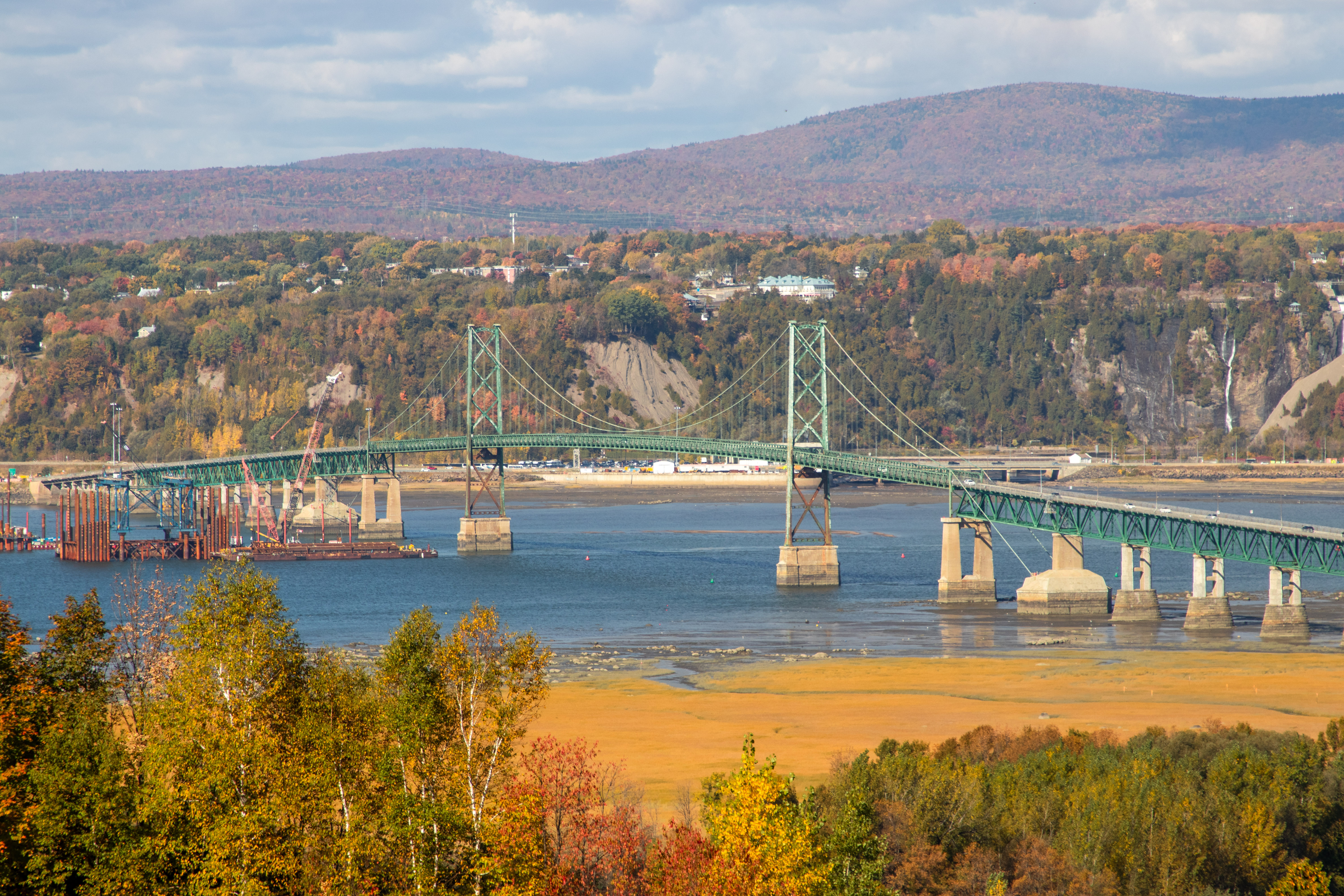
- Coordinates: 46.880233°N 71.137883°W
- Carries: Quebec Route 368
- Crosses: St. Lawrence River
- Locale: Quebec City and Île d'Orléans

Characteristics
- Design: Suspension bridge/Truss bridge
- Total length: 1.733 km (1.077 mi)
- Width: 9.6 m (31 ft)
- Height: 65.88 m (216.1 ft) to top of towers
- Longest span: 323 m (1,060 ft)
- No. of lanes: 2

History
- Designer: Philip Louis Pratley
- Opened: 1935

Location
- Interactive map of Orleans Island Bridge

The Île d'Orléans Bridge, known locally as the Pont de l'Île, is a suspension bridge that spans the Saint Lawrence River between the Beauport borough of Quebec City and Île d'Orléans (Orléans Island) in the Canadian province of Quebec. It is part of Quebec Route 368 and connects to Autoroute 40 on the north side.

The island was originally accessible only by ferry or by ice bridge during the winter. An electoral promise made by Premier Louis-Alexandre Taschereau to Montmorency County for a job-creation project during the Great Depression led to the construction of this bridge in 1934. It was completed in 1935 and initially named Taschereau Bridge.

The bridge, which uses under-deck trusses on the approaches to the main suspension-type span, is the furthest downstream of the Saint Lawrence River's fixed crossings, but it does not cross the entire river.

A replacement bridge is under construction and is expected to complete in 2028.

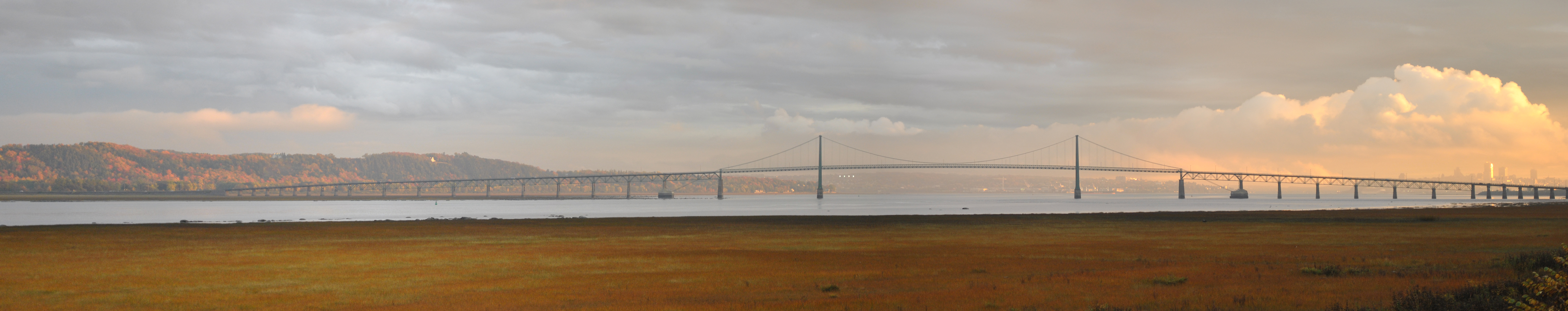

== See also ==
- List of bridges in Canada
- List of crossings of the Saint Lawrence River
