= Jean-Drapeau Park =

Urban park in Montreal, Canada

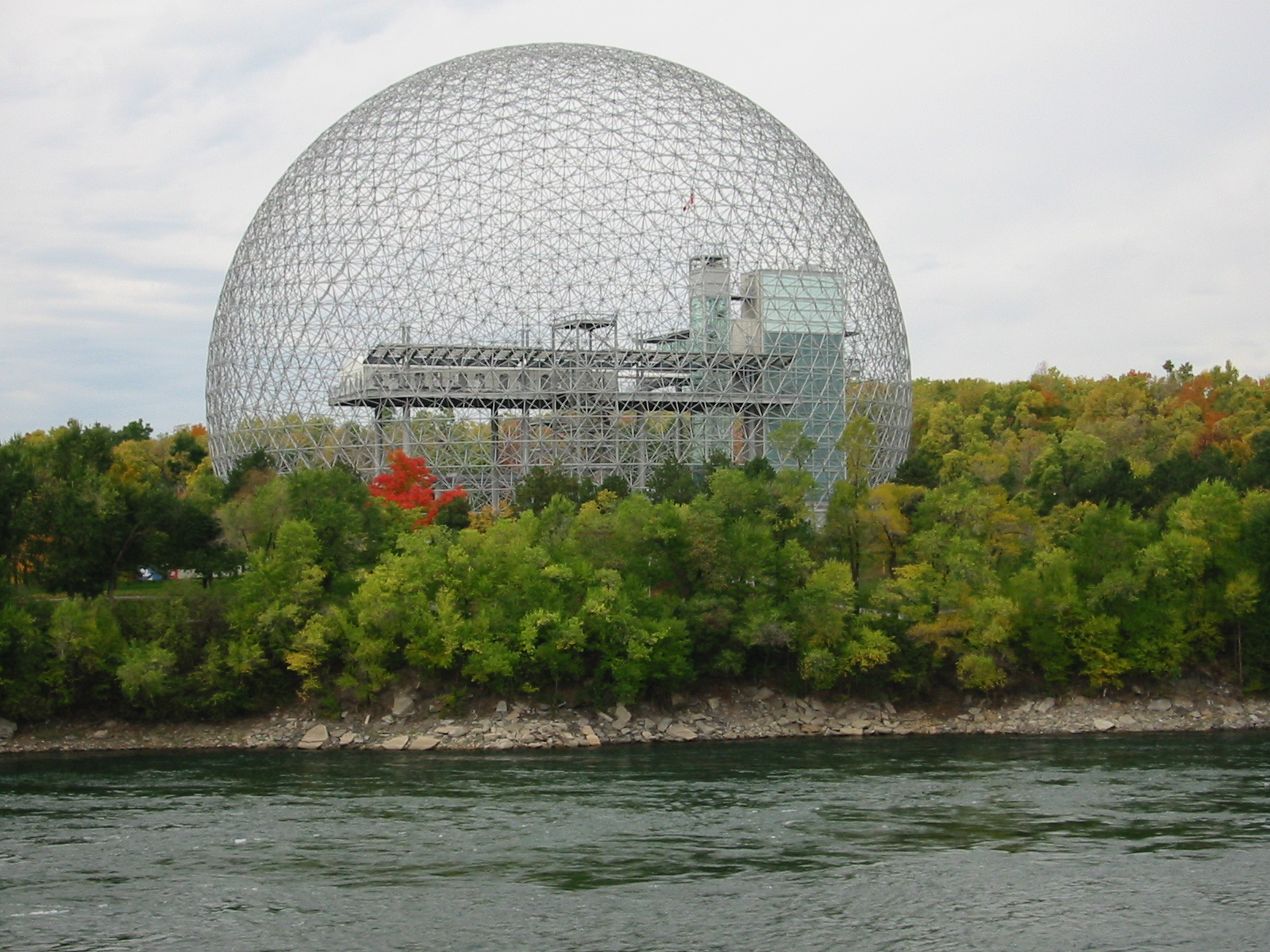
- The Biosphere
- Interactive map of Jean-Drapeau Park
- Type: Urban park
- Location: Ville-Marie, Montreal, Quebec, Canada
- Coordinates: 45°30′34″N 73°31′39″W
- Area: 209 hectares (520 acres)
- Created: 1874
- Operator: Société du parc Jean-Drapeau
- Status: Open all year
- Public transit: Jean-Drapeau station
- Website: Parc Jean-Drapeau

Jean Drapeau Park (formerly called Parc des Îles) is the third-largest park in Montreal, Quebec, Canada. It comprises two islands, Saint Helen's Island and the artificial island Notre Dame Island, situated off the shore of Old Montreal in the Saint Lawrence River.

The islands were the site of the Expo 67 world's fair. Notre Dame Island was constructed for the exposition, and Saint Helen's Island artificially extended at its north and south ends. The park was renamed in honour of Jean Drapeau, the late mayor of Montreal and initiator of Expo 67.

== History ==
Saint Helen's Island was discovered by French explorer Samuel de Champlain in 1611, who named it in honour of his wife, Hélène de Champlain, née Boullé. It also bears the name of Helena, mother of Roman emperor Constantine the Great.

The island belonged to the family of Le Moyne de Longueuil from 1665 until 1818, when it was sold to the British government. The British built a fort, a magazine and a bunker after the War of 1812. The new Canadian government acquired it in 1870, and it was converted into a park in 1874.

The islands of the archipelago were chosen as the site of Man and His World (Expo 67). To prepare for this role, Mayor Jean Drapeau expanded Saint Helen's Island and consolidated it with several neighboring islands (including Round Island) and created Notre Dame Island using the fill excavated during the construction of the Montreal Metro in the early 1960s. 28 million tons of fill were needed for this massive undertaking. When the work was completed, Notre-Dame Island and St. Helen's Island hosted Expo 67, which featured pavilions from over sixty countries.

After the closing of Expo in late 1967, the site continued its fair vocation under the name Man and His World until 1984, and finally, most facilities were dismantled and the island was converted into a park. In 1999, the Parc des Îles de Montreal was renamed Parc Jean-Drapeau in honour of former Mayor of Montreal, Jean Drapeau, who had re-shaped the islands, built the Montreal Metro and brought Expo 67 to the city.

== Attractions ==
Summer is the high season for the park, as the majority of attractions are open to the public. These include:

- An amusement park, La Ronde operated by La Ronde Operations, Inc. under an emphyteutic lease
- The Montreal Casino
- An environmental museum at the Montreal Biosphere (United States pavilion during Expo 67)
- The early Victorian Era fortifications at Saint Helen Island Fort
- A Formula One race track, the Circuit Gilles Villeneuve, which hosts the Canadian Grand Prix
- The city's largest outdoor concert venue, regularly hosting the Vans Warped Tour, Osheaga Festival and Heavy MTL, and as of 2014, an EDM festival known as île Soniq. In recent years, the 65,000-capacity venue is also used for the stadium concert tours of many mostly North American-born recording artists, which have included those of Garth Brooks, Kenny Chesney, Kendrick Lamar, Katy Perry, U2 and The Weeknd.
- An Olympic rowing basin
- An aquatics centre, which hosted the 2005 World Aquatics Championships
- A beach, Plage Jean-Doré

During winter for several weekends, the park throws the winter carnival Fête des neiges de Montréal which is a free event that offers a variety of winter activities.

The islands also boast numerous hiking and skiing trails, bike paths, large athletic grounds and diverse other services and conveniences. During the more temperate months, a diverse array of free and pay activities are offered on a weekly basis in addition to the aforementioned attractions. There's also a weekly electronic dance festival located under Alexander Calder's sculpture Man, commissioned for Expo 67.

The islands are also notable for the remnants of Expo 67, most of which are still in use, though few are still standing. The American and French pavilions are the best preserved, functioning today as the Biosphere and Casino respectively. The Canadian pavilion contains administrative offices, rental halls, and is the site of the studio of Radio-Classique Montréal. The former Tunisian and Jamaican pavilions are also in use, the former for bike rentals while the latter is used principally for receptions.

A considerable portion of Île Notre-Dame was redeveloped into an intricate and elaborate flower garden in the early 1980s, which remains today. The only other significant remnant of the former World's Fair is the Place des Nations at the western end of Île Sainte-Hélène, though this is abandoned and officially off-limits. As such, it's become a popular spot for fishing.

A snowboarding park was added in winter 2009.

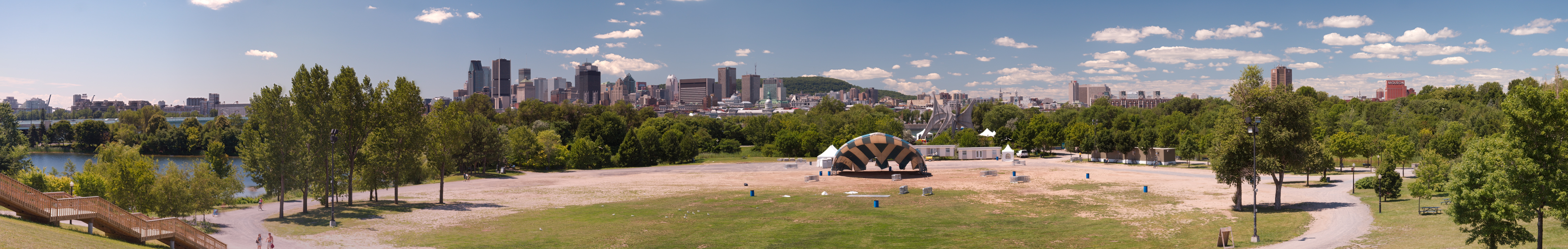
Parc Jean-Drapeau

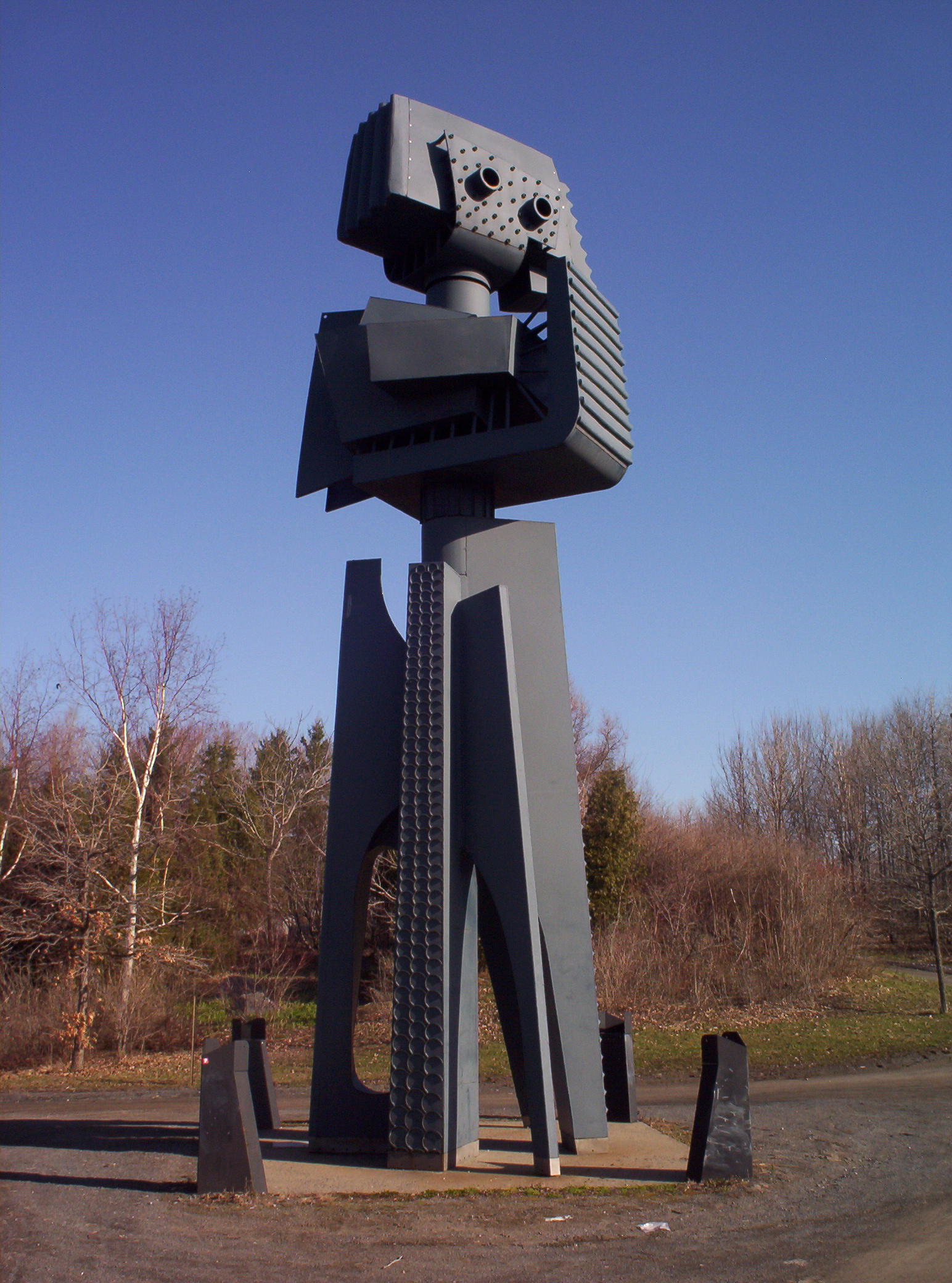
"Le Phare du Cosmos" (1967) by Yves Trudeau (created for Expo 67) in St. Helen's Island in Parc Jean-Drapeau, Montréal, Quebec

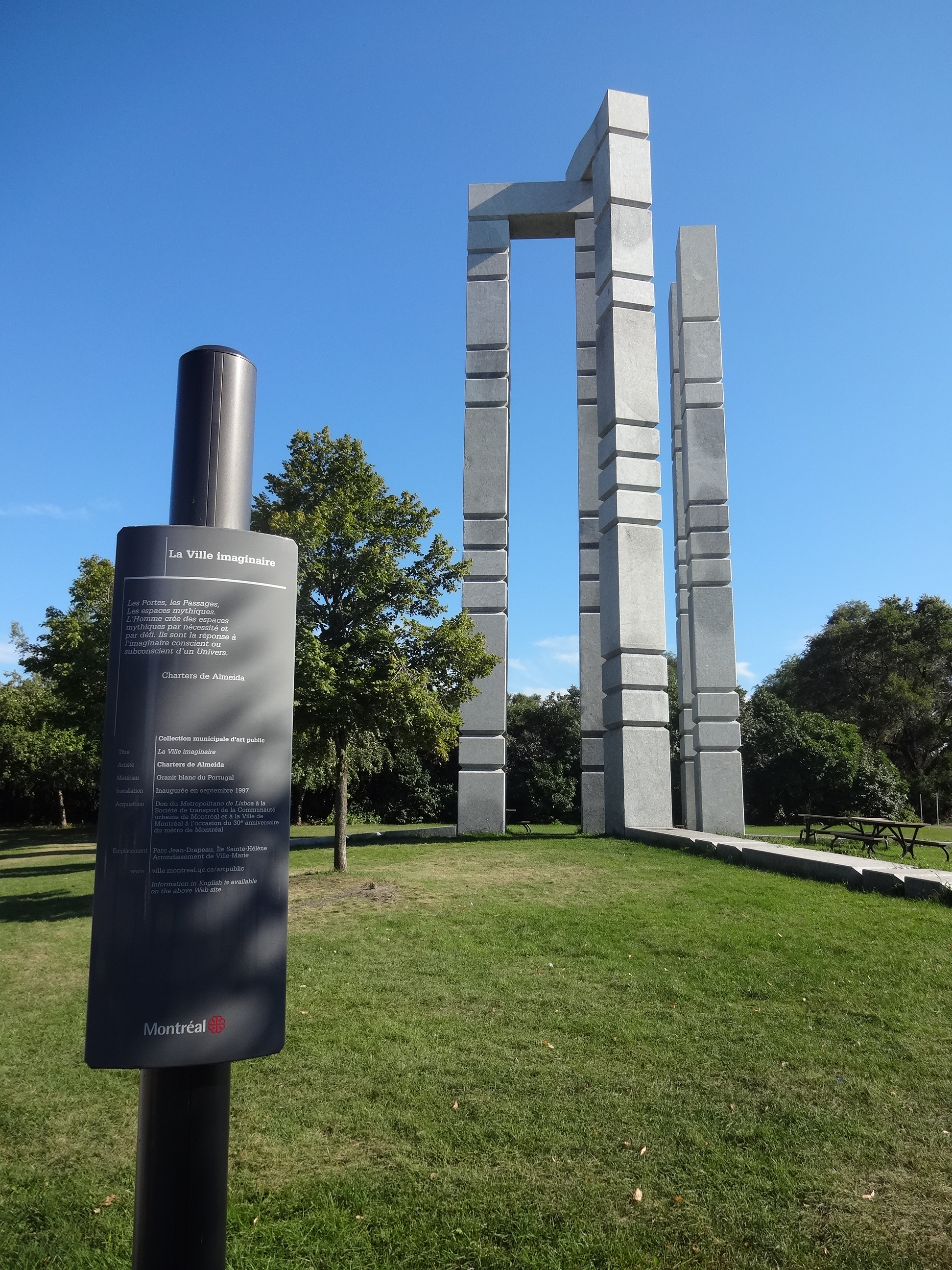
Monument

== See also ==
- Hochelaga Archipelago
- Rubicon Riders, Montreal Dragon Boat Racing Team
