= Heavy Montréal =

Annual heavy metal and hard rock festival

- Dates: 27 & 28 July (2019 dates)
- Locations: Parc Jean-Drapeau, Montreal, Quebec, Canada
- Years active: 2008; 2010–2016; 2018–2019; 2023
- Website: heavymontreal.com

Heavy Montréal (stylized as Heavy MONTRÉAL, formerly known as Heavy MTL) is a two-day, summer heavy metal and hard rock music festival held annually at Parc Jean-Drapeau in Montreal, Quebec, Canada. It also includes various other events at different venues across the city. The "MTL" in the former name, Heavy MTL, served as both an abbreviation for "Montreal" and "Metal". In 2014, the festival was officially renamed as "Heavy Montréal". In 2023, the festival revived the "Heavy MTL" moniker once again through its logo.

== History ==
Since the festival's first edition in 2008, Heavy Montréal, known until 2014 as "Heavy MTL", has seen some of the world's most successful heavy metal acts, such as Iron Maiden, Metallica, Megadeth, Testament, Kiss, Dethklok, Rob Zombie, Korn, Avenged Sevenfold, Slayer, Alice Cooper, Motörhead, Godsmack, In Flames, Slipknot, Marilyn Manson, Deftones, System of a Down, Five Finger Death Punch, Children of Bodom and Babymetal.

In 2011, a sister event, Heavy T.O., was created for Downsview Park in Toronto, Ontario, Canada. Both events were held during the same weekends, with most bands playing one day in Montreal and the other in Toronto. Despite the Toronto event's popularity, however, promoters ceased operations there after the festival's 2012 incarnation.

For the 2014 festival, Heavy MTL was officially rebranded as "Heavy Montréal". This was done as an "evolution" of the festival, with efforts made to include a wide array of styles in its programming.

The festival took a one-year hiatus in 2017, citing the renovations taking place that year in Parc Jean-Drapeau and the increase in other cultural events due to Montreal celebrating its 375th anniversary. In November 2019, event promotions company Evenko announced that Heavy Montreal would not occur in 2020, in part due to "the number of non-festival metal/rock concerts that will be announced over the next few months", said Evenko chief operating officer Jacques Aubé.

== Past editions ==
=== 2019 ===
The lineup included:

Saturday, 27 July 2019
| Stage Heavy | Stage de l'Apocalypse | Stage de la Foret | Stage du Jardin |
|---|---|---|---|
| Fever 333; Kataklysm; Beartooth; Killswitch Engage; Godsmack; Ghost | Galactic Empire; Anonymus; Quiet Riot; Hatebreed; Steel Panther; Evanescence | Harm's Way; Devin Townsend; All That Remains; Cancer Bats; Municipal Waste; Watain | Brand of Sacrifice; Lorna Shore; Nekrogoblikon; Rivers of Nihil; The Faceless; Carnifex; Cattle Decapitation; Dying Fetus |

Sunday, 28 July 2019
| Stage Heavy | Stage de l'Apocalypse | Stage de la Foret | Stage du Jardin |
|---|---|---|---|
| Knocked Loose; Despised Icon; Skillet; In This Moment; Slash; Slayer^{1} | Mountain Dust; Beast in Black; Atreyu; Gamma Ray; Clutch; Anthrax | Dopethrone; Skálmöld; Fu Manchu; Gloryhammer; Terror; Counterparts; Stick to Your Guns | Junkowl; Dirty Honey; The Great Sabatini; Metalachi; 3Teeth; Demolition Hammer |

=== 2018 ===
Heavy Montreal returned in 2018 after a one-year hiatus.

The lineup included:

Saturday, 28 July 2018
| Stage Heavy | Stage de l'Apocalypse | Stage de la Foret | Stage du Jardin |
|---|---|---|---|
| Pallbearer; Sword; Tech N9ne; I Prevail; Marilyn Manson; Rob Zombie | Born of Osiris; Lee Aaron; Baroness; Alestorm; Underoath; Emperor | Veil of Maya; The Black Dahlia Murder; Witchcraft; Napalm Death; Red Fang; Between the Buried and Me | Jungle Rot; Entheos; Soreption; Allegaeon; The Agony Scene; Erra; Jinjer |

Sunday, 29 July 2018
| Stage Heavy | Stage de l'Apocalypse | Stage de la Foret | Stage du Jardin |
|---|---|---|---|
| Helix; Demon Hunter; Voivod; Asking Alexandria; Hollywood Undead; Limp Bizkit^{1} | Intervals; Emmure; Ultra Vomit; Sleep; Trivium; Gojira | Blind Witness; Power Trip; Warbringer; Gloryhammer; Eyehategod; Perturbator | Nonhuman Era; Get the Shot; Bad Omens; Havok; Khemmis; Necrotic Mutation |

1. Replaced Avenged Sevenfold

=== 2016 ===
The 2016 edition of Heavy Montréal took place on 6–7 August 2016. For 2016 the festival was held on a new site in Parc Jean-Drapeau, la Plaine des Jeux.

The lineup included:

Saturday, 6 August 2016
| Molson Canadian stage | Heavy stage | Blabbermouth.NET stage |
|---|---|---|
| Pop Evil; Escape the Fate; Fear Factory; Trivium; Sabaton; Mastodon; Five Finger Death Punch | USA Out of Vietnam; The Dillinger Escape Plan; Carcass; Sebastian Bach; Black Label Society; Nightwish | Inquisition; Skeletonwitch; Repulsion; Attila; Suicide Silence; Cult of Luna |

Sunday, 7 August 2016
| Molson Canadian stage | Heavy stage | Blabbermouth.NET stage |
|---|---|---|
| I Prevail; Despised Icon; Saint Asonia; Blind Guardian; Alter Bridge; Breaking Benjamin; Disturbed | We Came as Romans; Animals as Leaders; Kataklysm; Zakk Wylde; Killswitch Engage; Volbeat | Mantar; Beartooth; Memphis May Fire; B.A.R.F. Suffocation; Napalm Death; Candlemass |

=== 2015 ===
The 2015 edition of Heavy Montréal took place over three days from 7 to 9 August 2015.

The lineup included:

Friday, 7 August 2015
| Molson Canadian stage | Heavy stage | Apocalypse stage | Forest stage |
|---|---|---|---|
| The Flatliners; Anonymus; Extreme; Meshuggah; Korn | Gorguts; Venom; Arch Enemy; Lagwagon; Alexisonfire | Brothers of the Sonic Cloth; Revocation; The Acacia Strain; Veil of Maya; Lofofora; Neurosis | toyGuitar; Beyond Creation; Cattle Decapitation; Nothing More.moneen. Augury |

Saturday, 8 August 2015
| Molson Canadian stage | Heavy stage | Apocalypse stage | Forest stage |
|---|---|---|---|
| Slaves on Dope; Rocket from the Crypt; Abbath; Testament; NOFX; Faith No More | Deafheaven; Lita Ford; Gojira; Billy Talent; Iggy Pop | The Brains; Glassjaw; Swingin' Utters; B.A.R.F. Devin Townsend Project; Dying Fetus | Mass Murder Messiah; Ion Dissonance; Masked Intruder; Dig It Up; The Agonist; Battlecross |

Sunday, 9 August 2015
| Molson Canadian stage | Heavy stage | Apocalypse stage | Forest stage |
|---|---|---|---|
| Fozzy; Coal Chamber; Dokken; Asking Alexandria; Bullet for My Valentine; Slipknot | Motionless in White; Warrant; Marky Ramone's Blitzkrieg; Within Temptation; Lamb of God | Omnium Gatherum; Insomnium; Jasta; Pig Destroyer; Sanctuary; Ihsahn; Nuclear Assault | Exes for Eyes; Sandveiss; Dead Tired; Small Brown Bike; Upon a Burning Body; Wilson |

=== 2014 ===
The lineup included:

Saturday, 9 August 2014
| Molson Canadian stage | Heavy stage | Apocalypse stage | Forest stage |
|---|---|---|---|
| Monster Truck; Overkill; Apocalyptica; Dropkick Murphys; Anthrax; Metallica | Babymetal; Pennywise; Three Days Grace; Voivod; The Offspring | Eagle Tears; Mass Hysteria; Municipal Waste; Whitechapel; Protest the Hero; The Vandals; Madball | Kublai Khan; Biblical; Unlocking the Truth; Whores. Nekrogoblikon; Beyond Creation |

Sunday, 10 August 2014
| Molson Canadian stage | Heavy stage | Apocalypse stage | Forest stage |
|---|---|---|---|
| GrimSkunk; Exodus; Symphony X Hatebreed; Twisted Sister; Slayer | Bat Sabbath; Death Angel^{1} Epica; Body Count; Bad Religion; Lamb of God | La Corriveau; Nashville Pussy; Cynic; We Came as Romans; Alestorm; Unearth; Fucked Up | Beheading of a King; Sworn In; Gideon; Stick to Your Guns; The Motorleague; Nepentes; Truckfighters |

1. Replaced Dirty Rotten Imbeciles

=== 2013 ===
For the 2013 edition, Heavy MTL also featured a live pro wrestling event showcasing men and women of the Montreal independent wrestling scene.

Saturday, 10 August 2013
| Molson Canadian stage | Jägermeister stage | Galaxy stage | Ring Heavy Mania |
|---|---|---|---|
| Obey the Brave; Hellyeah; Gwar; Steel Panther; At the Gates; Danzig with Doyle; Avenged Sevenfold | Device; Halestorm; Sick of It All; Black Label Society; A Day to Remember; Megadeth | Death Lullaby; Within the Ruins; Blackguard; Baroness; Oceano; Newsted; All Shall Perish; Motionless in White; Wintersun | Wall of Death – Battle Royal; Buxx vs. Franky; 3.0 vs. TDT; Green Phantom vs. SeXXXy Eddy |

Sunday, 11 August 2013
| Molson Canadian stage | Jägermeister stage | Galaxy stage | Ring Heavy Mania |
|---|---|---|---|
| Huntress; Finntroll; Philip H. Anselmo & The Illegals; Machine Head; Mastodon; Rob Zombie | Augury; The Acacia Strain; Amon Amarth; August Burns Red; Children of Bodom; Godsmack | Of Temples; Slaves on Dope; Indian Handcrafts; Structures; Unexpect; Pallbearer; Havok; Cryptopsy | Wall of Death – Battle Royal; 6 Way Scramble; Kickin n' Stompin+Green Phantom vs. TDT+ Buxx Belmar; Player Uno vs. Franky the Mobster |

=== 2012 ===
Saturday, 11 August 2012
| Heavy MTL stage | Jägermeister stage | Apocalypse stage |
|---|---|---|
| Diemonds; Veil of Maya; Between the Buried and Me; Cannibal Corpse; Deftones; System of a Down | Job for a Cowboy; Periphery; Kataklysm; Killswitch Engage; Five Finger Death Punch | Bookakee; Dark Century; Rose Funeral; Exhumed; Fleshgod Apocalypse; Goatwhore; Origin; The Faceless; Battlecross |

Sunday, 12 August 2012
| Heavy MTL stage | Jägermeister stage | Apocalypse stage |
|---|---|---|
| Dance Laury Dance; Protest the Hero; Gojira; The Dillinger Escape Plan^{1} In Flames^{2} Slipknot | Blind Witness; Overkill; Trivium; Suicidal Tendencies; Marilyn Manson | Hollow; The Agonist; Iwrestledabearonce; B.A.R.F. Emmure; Cancer Bats; Sword; Voivod |

1. Replaced Dethklok
2. Replaced Lamb of God
3. Replaced High on Fire

=== 2011 ===
Saturday, 23 July 2011
| Heavy MTL stage | Jägermeister stage | Budweiser stage |
|---|---|---|
| Slaves on Dope; Red Fang; Suicide Silence; Machine Head; In Flames; Godsmack; Disturbed | Dead and Divine; All Shall Perish; Death Angel; Unearth; Trivium; Billy Talent | Mass Murder Messiah; Straight Line Stitch; Blackguard; Kingdom of Sorrow; GrimSkunk; Necronomicon; Dissension; Cryptopsy |

Sunday, 24 July 2011
| Heavy MTL stage | Jägermeister stage | Budweiser stage |
|---|---|---|
| Lazarus A.D. Girlschool; As I Lay Dying; Morbid Angel; Opeth; Kiss | Endast; Times of Grace; Annihilator; Children of Bodom; Anthrax; Motörhead | Les Guenilles; Anonymus; Slaves on Dope^{1} Diamond Head; DevilDriver; The Catalyst; Gorguts |

1. Replaced The Sword

=== 2010 ===
Saturday, 24 July 2010
| Heavy MTL stage | Jägermeister stage |
|---|---|
| Skeletonwitch; High on Fire; Kataklysm; Anvil; Rob Halford; Slayer; Megadeth | 36 Crazyfists; Baptized in Blood; Melissa Auf der Maur; Fear Factory; Testament; Mastodon; Alice Cooper |

Sunday, 25 July 2010
| Rockstar Mayhem Festival stage | Jägermeister stage | Silver Star stage |
|---|---|---|
| Hail the Villain; Despised Icon; Airbourne; Winds of Plague; Five Finger Death Punch; Lamb of God; Rob Zombie; Korn | Beneath the Massacre; Shadows Fall; Chimaira; Hatebreed; Alexisonfire; Avenged Sevenfold | Deadly Apples; Les Ékorchés; Norma Jean; Diamond Head; 3 Inches of Blood; In This Moment; Atreyu |

=== 2009 ===
Due to the high number of metal live shows performed in Montreal during the year (Metallica, AC/DC, Kiss, Dream Theater, Marilyn Manson, Motörhead and many more) it was announced that the festival would not take place in 2009 and return in 2010.

=== 2008 ===
Saturday, 21 June 2008
| Black stage | Red stage |
|---|---|
| Lauren Harris; 3 Inches of Blood; Hatebreed; Mastodon; Iron Maiden | Unexpect; Overkill; Symphony X HammerFall; Type O Negative; Mastodon; Dethklok |

Sunday, 22 June 2008
| Black stage | Red stage |
|---|---|
| Death Boat; Priestess; Drowning Pool; Voivod; Three Days Grace; Mötley Crüe | Your Favorite Enemies; Warrant; Shadows Fall; Anthrax; Disturbed |

== See also ==
- Osheaga Festival, music festival at Parc Jean-Drapeau
- ÎleSoniq Music Festival, music festival at Parc Jean-Drapeau
- Heavy Montreal, music festival at Parc Jean-Drapeau
- Piknic Électronik, weekly electronic music festival at Parc Jean-Drapeau during summer
