= VELD Music Festival =

Electronic dance music festival in Toronto, Ontario

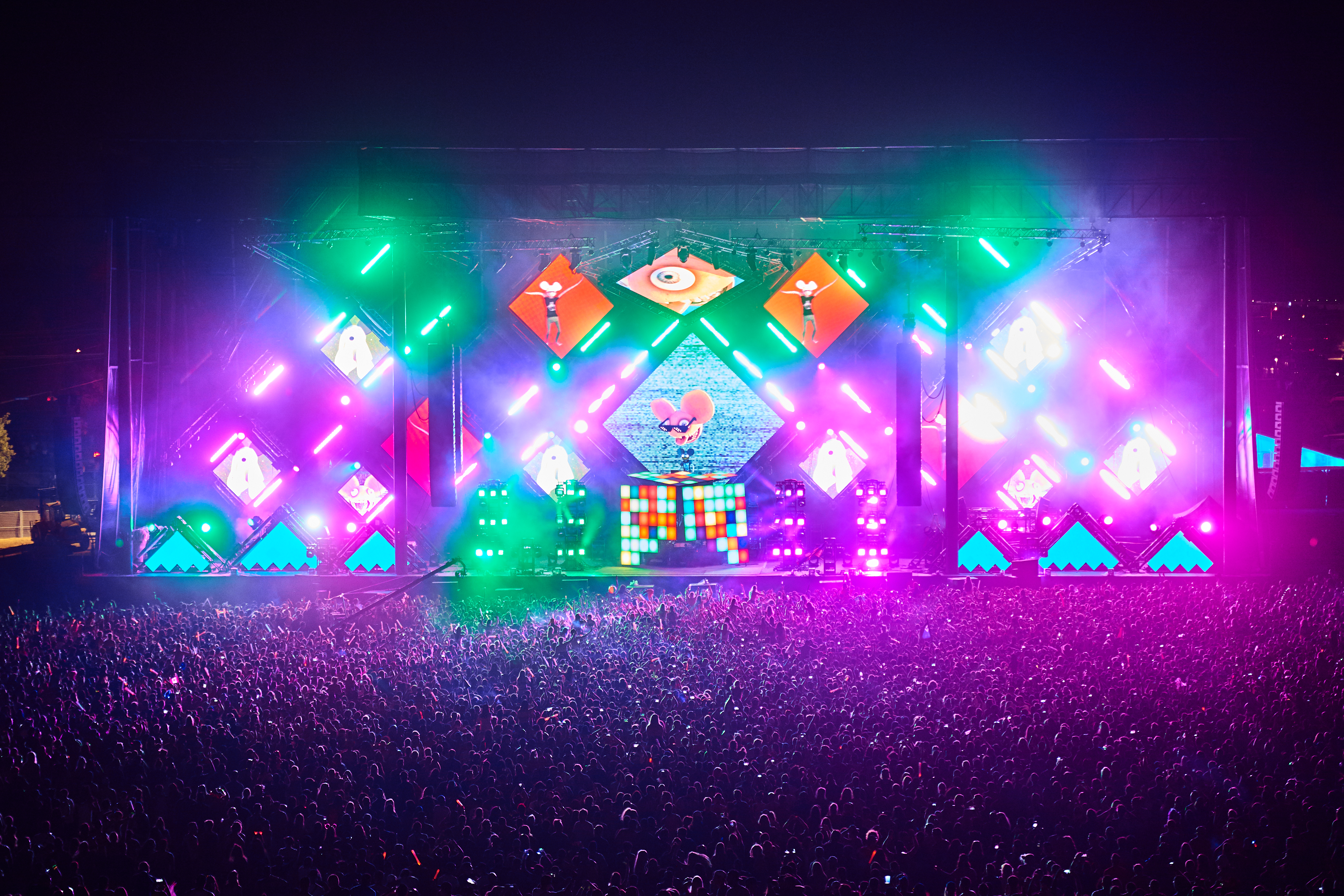
- Deadmau5 performing at VELD's 2016 edition
- Genre: Electronic dance music
- Date: July 31 – August 2 (2026)
- Locations: Downsview Park, Toronto, Ontario, Canada
- Years active: 2012–present
- Attendance: 105,000 (2026, 3 days total)
- Capacity: 42,000 (all stages combined)
- Sponsor: Red Bull, Bud Light, Jack Daniels, Government of Ontario.
- Website: veldmusicfestival.com

The VELD Music Festival (commonly referred to as VELD) is an annual electronic dance music festival in Canada, held at Downsview Park in Toronto, Ontario. Since its inception in 2012, the festival has had a number of notable artists, including Deadmau5, Martin Garrix, Armin van Buuren, Hardwell, Steve Aoki, Zedd, Illenium, and Tiësto.

The festival features three concert stages: the Main Stage for headliners, the Bass Stage, and the Sirkus Stage. The Bass Stage features dubstep, trap, riddim, and other sub-genres of EDM, while the Sirkus Stage hosts mostly techno and house music with entry-line DJs. The VELD is the second-largest EDM festival in Canada after the ÎleSoniq Music Festival in Montreal.

Due to the COVID-19 pandemic, the 2020 and 2021 editions of the event were cancelled.

== History ==
=== 2012 ===
In April 2012, a two-day electronic dance music (EDM) festival to be held at Downsview Park in the Toronto area on August 4–5 was announced. The initial line-up included notable EDM acts such as Deadmau5, Avicii, Bassnectar, Steve Aoki, Steve Angello, Knife Party, and Nicky Romero. The festival, organized by Charles Khabouth's INK Entertainment, features two neighboring stages and performances by about thirty or so different artists. The event is named after "The Veldt", a song by Deadmau5 and a veld, the Dutch word for "field".

On Saturday, August 5, Deadmau5 headlined at the first day of the event. The festival was attended by a crowd numbering around 20,000 concertgoers. Despite rain in the early part of his performance, Deadmau5 performed to what the Rolling Stone described as an "enraptured" audience in a mood akin to "a glowing Woodstock". As the rain eventually stopped, the DJ would perform a 90-minute set which included songs such as the festival's namesake "The Veldt", "Aural Psynapse" and "Strobe". Besides Deadmau5 and the other artists announced earlier, the festival included a performance by Avicii, who performed as the final-day headliner.

=== 2013 ===
Deadmau5 would also headline at the second annual festival held on August 3–4, 2013. The year saw the return of Steve Aoki and Steve Angello along with performances by Dada Life, Kaskade, Above & Beyond, and Madeon. Other local Canadian artists included Adventure Club, Carlo Lio, Greg Gow and Manzone & Strong.

=== 2014 ===
The third two-day event in 2014 was sponsored by Red Bull and Bacardi. The festival featured over thirty artists from the EDM and hip-hop genres, including Armin van Buuren, Calvin Harris, Iggy Azalea, NERO, Waka Flocka Flame and Zedd. The concerts were held on the weekend of August 2–3.

The first day of performances began with opening acts that included Oliver Heldens, Overwerk, W&W, Bingo Players. This was followed by an hour-long performance by the British band NERO. The penultimate set of the night was performed by Sebastian Ingrosso, a former member of the Swedish House Mafia. Armin van Buuren performed the final concert of the evening.

Sunday featured performances by Adventure Club on the main VELD Stage and a notable performance by SAVOY on the Bacardi Stage. Other performances of the night included Iggy Azalea, Gramatik, Tommy Trash, Zedd, and Knife Party. The night's festivities ended with a set by Calvin Harris which included a performance of popular hit "Summer".

On August 4, Mark Saunders, then deputy chief of the Toronto Police, reported that fifteen people had fallen ill after ingesting "party drugs" at the event. Of those, thirteen were hospitalized and two had died. One of the dead was handcuffed by police during transport to the hospital and had died in the ambulance. Ontario's Special Investigations Unit (SIU), which investigates possible officer misconduct launched an investigation into the circumstances of his death. SIU concluded their investigation and announced that "Toronto Police were not responsible for the death."

The Toronto Police Homicide Squad also launched a separate criminal investigation into the deaths and illnesses caused by the drugs. Police urged people that had attended the event to hand over any drugs obtained at the event in order to aid in the investigation. On August 5, Police revealed that the investigation was focused on two drugs found at the event, "a 'small brown pill' and a 'small clear capsule with a white substance' [but that] police don't yet know what drug caused the illnesses." The investigation concluded, a year later, that the deaths were accidental.

=== 2015 ===
In February 2015, INK Entertainment announced that Deadmau5 will again be one of the headliners of the summer event to be held August 1–2. In April, it was announced that Hardwell will be the final headliner in the second day of the event. Other notable artists announced included A$AP Rocky, Borgore, Carnage, Chocolate Puma, DVBBS, Gorgon City, Hot Since 82, Kill the Noise, Laidback Luke, Nicky Romero, Oliver Heldens, Pretty Lights, Steve Aoki, and The Chainsmokers.

On July 19, the Toronto Star reported that the "organizers are vowing to crack down on illicit substance use at the event." Among the safety measures announced were two "amnesty boxes" at the entrance to collect unwanted illegal drugs and advisory packets which included maps directing people to medical, food and water stations. There would also be public service announcements in between performances and a designated "safe and chill space" where festival-goers with adverse drug reactions can be assessed.

Day one of the 2015 festival began with a performance by Manzone & Strong. Later in the day, a set by The Chainsmokers was interrupted due to a weather alert. The festival eventually continued, after a delay, with a performance from Steve Aoki who rallied the crowd. The second stage saw the rowdy performances by Borgore and A$AP Rocky. In typical fashion, the evening ended with a set from Deadmau5, returning for his third time to the VELD stage.

Day two began with a performance by Dzeko & Torres on the main stage while SNBRN performed a set on the Bacardi Stage. Around 6 pm, after a performance by Oliver Heldens, there was an announcement that due to the approaching storm the remainder of the event would be canceled and that the area evacuated. However, some people in attendance lingered a while before complying with the evacuation. The weather took a serious turn for the worse with a storm that included thunder, lightning, and hail. Nonetheless, INK Entertainment received criticism for the cancellation and demands for a refund through social media. Organizers announced a few days later that they would offer a forty percent refund for all tickets purchased at authorized retailers. Above & Beyond, Duke Dumont, Hot Since 82 and Hardwell, the headliner of the evening, were among the acts that never made it to the stage.

=== 2016 ===
In March 2016, it was announced that this year's festival will see the return of Deadmau5, DVBBS, Steve Aoki and The Chainsmokers along with Travis Scott, Flume, Kygo, and Martin Garrix. In June, the full lineup for the July 30–31 event was announced and included Post Malone and Duke Dumont, among others. The organizers stated that similar safety measures will be in place this year with additional stations and staff. The company also rented a nearby building to serve as an additional medical center staffed with a doctor and nurses.

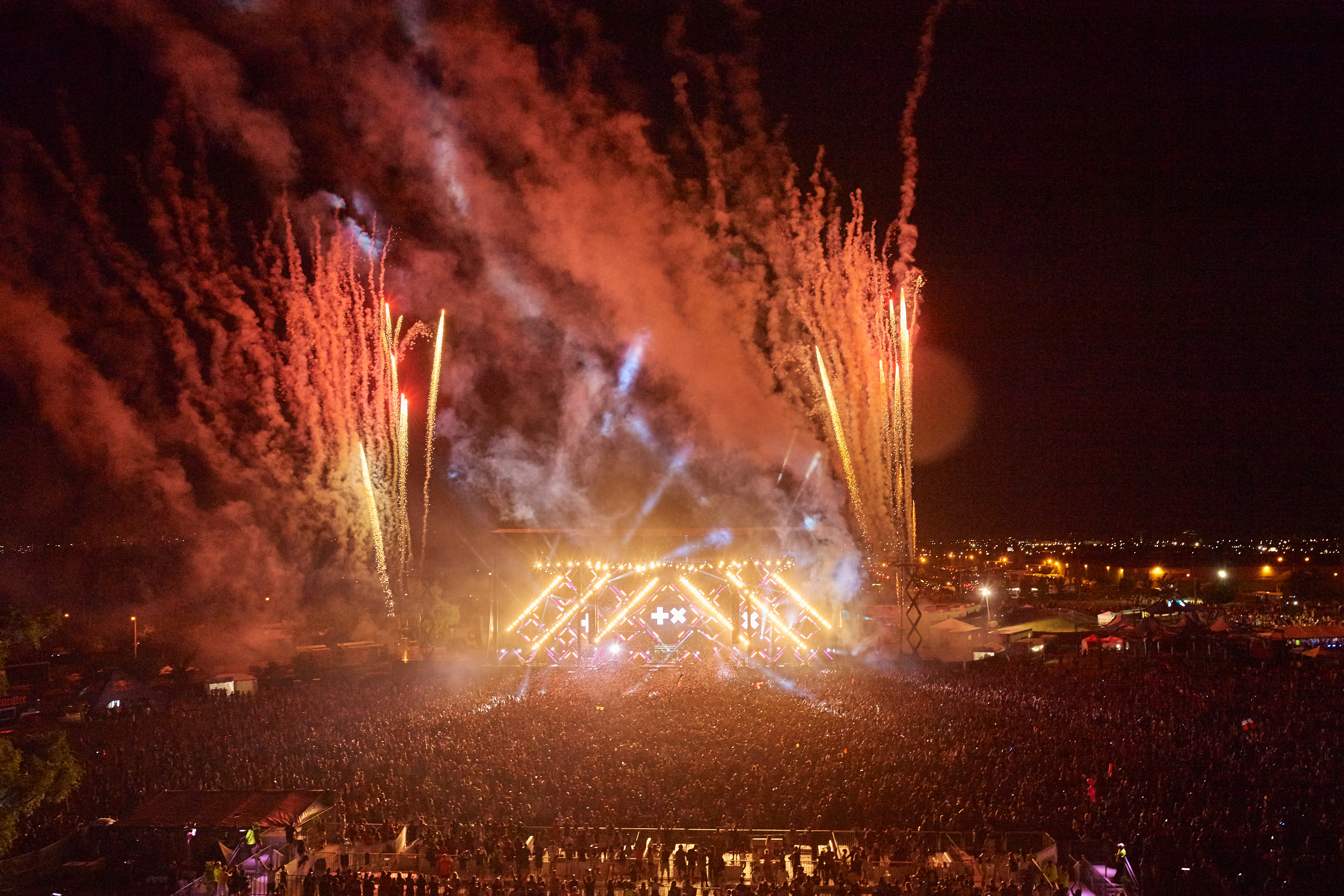
Martin Garrix finale with pyrotechnics

The Saturday concerts began with a set by Galantis followed by another DJ duo Yellow Claw. This was followed by another performance by Steve Aoki, a veteran of the VELD stage. Duke Dumont, who had missed out on the previous year's festival due to bad weather, performed on the second stage, now renamed the Terra Stage. The main stage saw performances by DVBBS followed by a half-hour set by Flume. The night's festivities ended with a performance by deadmau5, who would again play the festival's namesake song "The Veldt". The artist unveiled for the first time his new stage with a distinct cube design.

Sunday performances began under cloudy skies that soon cleared. The first on the main stage was New World Punx while Ephwurd performed on the second stage. The Chainsmokers, whose performance the previous year had been partially interrupted, would perform on the main stage. Kygo performed the second to last set on the main as the sun began to set. The evening ended with the headliner of the event Martin Garrix. His performance was capped off with fireworks fired from the stage.

=== 2017 ===
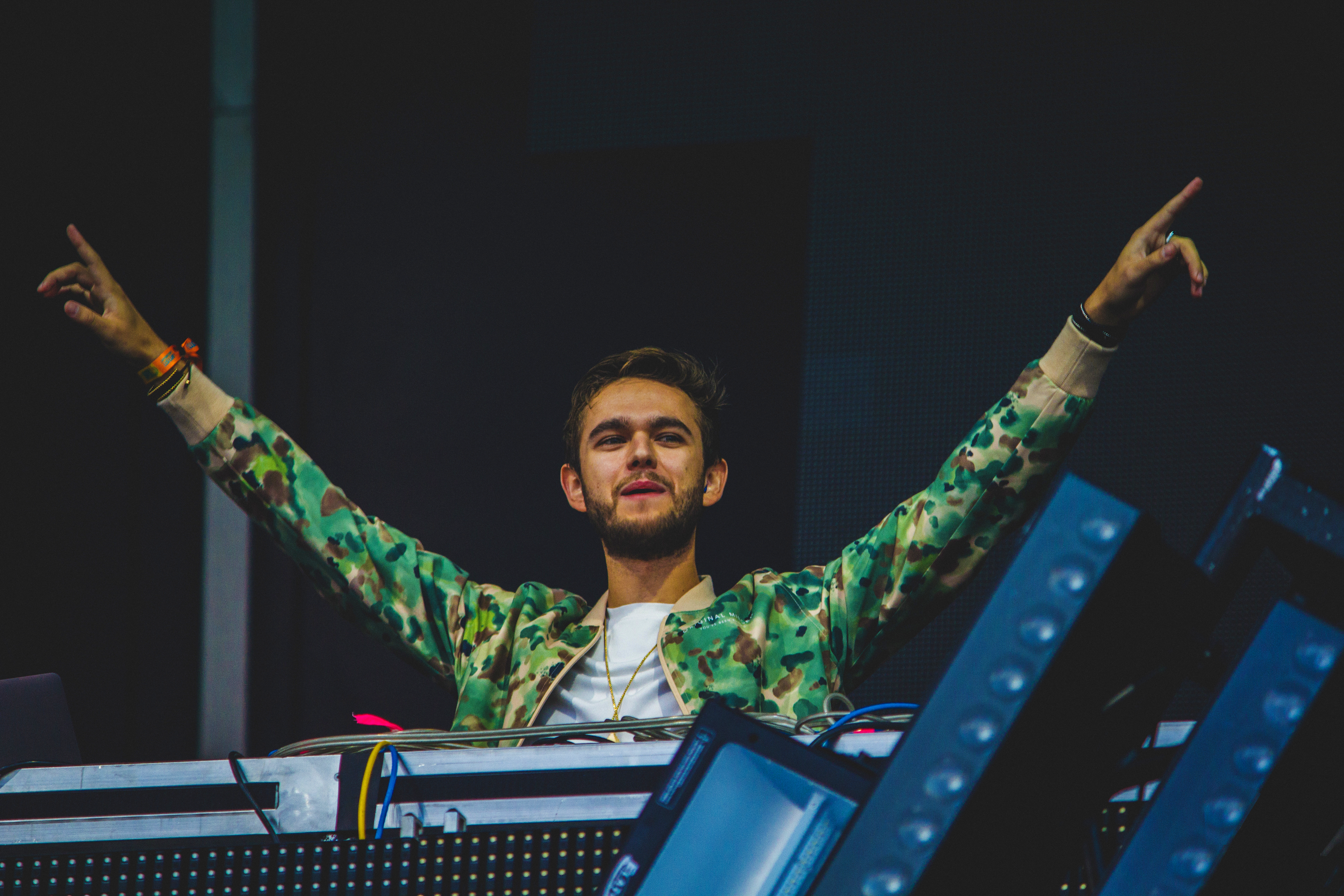
Zedd performing in 2017

In April 2017, it was announced that this year's festival would feature performances by Future, Major Lazer, and Tiësto. The organizers later announced that Zedd will also be one of the headliners of the event. The festival on August 5–6 will also include 3lau, A$AP Ferg, Borgore, Madeon, Migos, Lil Uzi Vert, Slushii, Tory Lanez, W&W and a few dozen more artists.

=== 2018 ===
In late February 2018, it was announced that the 2018 festival would include headline performances by DJ Snake and Marshmello, alongside returning 2016 headliner Martin Garrix and side stage act from 2017, Migos. The event was held on the first weekend of August, the 4th and 5th.

The first day suffered from grievances such as the late arrival of Migos and large groups of people crowding the water filling stations. The Migos actually switched the stage they were supposed to perform at last minute.

On the second day the water situation was improved by adding another water station, queues for the stations, and a large sprinkler. Before the last performance of the festival by Martin Garrix, a tribute set to the song Fade into Darkness was held for Avicii who had died earlier that year.

=== 2019 ===
In March 2019, VELD announced via Instagram that the festival would be returning in the summer for its 8th annual year. A few weeks later, lineups were announced, with Skrillex, Tiësto, Cardi B and Kygo headlining the festival from August 3 to August 4, 2019, in Downsview Park, Toronto, Ontario. Day 1 received positive reviews featuring performances by Skrillex, Ekali and TroyBoi. Some negative criticism was received because of headliner Cardi B who showed up 55 minutes late and played for just 20 minutes. The second day was reviewed as much better with Zeds Dead taking over the Hennessy Stage and Tiësto closing out the festival on the main stage. The overall praise of the festival was overwhelming with people demanding the festival to run 3 days for the year 2020.

=== 2020 ===
The VELD Music festival was expected to take place August 1–2, 2020, in Downsview Park, Toronto, ON. VELD was praised for no longer inviting a hip-hop artist on the mainstage because of repeated abuses of showing up extremely late (Migos, Cardi B). VELD 2020 instead will have hip-hop artists on the Hennessy Stage and have all 4 headliners on the mainstage as EDM artists including Armin Van Buuren, Illenium, Marshmello and Martin Garrix.

However, in the midst of the COVID-19 pandemic, Toronto Mayor John Tory announced on May 15, 2020, that all public gatherings of 25,000 or more are prohibited and no permits will be issued for these events until at least August 31. This resulted in the cancellation of the 2020 edition of VELD.

=== 2021 ===
The 2021 edition of the VELD Music Festival was scheduled to take place on July 31 - August 1, 2021, at Toronto's Downsview Park. However, the City of Toronto announced on May 14 that it is "extending the cancellation of all in-person City-led and City-permitted outdoor events to September 6, 2021". As a result, the festival was cancelled for the second year in a row.

=== 2022 ===
The VELD Music Festival took place from July 29–31 as the first VELD back after the coronavirus pandemic. Headliners included Martin Garrix, Marshmello, and Porter Robinson. Rappers such as Nardo Wick, Polo G, and the City Girls were expected to perform, though Galantis and Nardo Wick cancelled on short notice. VELD 2022 brought in the VELD Main Stage, the “Sirkus Stage”, and the sponsored “Rémy Martin Stage”.

=== 2023 ===
The 10th edition of VELD Music Festival started on August 4 with acts from Matroda, Eli Brown, Zedd, ILLENIUM, and more. Day 2 ended with Deadmau5 and Rezz playing a 75-minute set back-to-back. Day 3 ended with Tiësto at the main stage, Subtronics at the bass stage, and James Hype at the Sirkus Stage.

=== 2024 ===
The VELD Music Festival's 11th edition was held on August 2–4, 2024, at Downsview Park. The lineup was all EDM DJs, including Martin Garrix, Marshmello, Alan Walker, Alesso, etc. Among them, Martin Garrix and Marshmello's last participation at VELD was in 2022.

Sam Feldt and Jonas Blue performed a B2B as Endless Summer, while Eric Prydz presented his HOLO show for the first time in Toronto. Other notable acts include Black Tiger Sex Machine, Steve Aoki, Seven Lions, James Hype, Fisher, Frank Walker, Subtronics, Mitis, Alok and many others.

=== 2025 ===
The 2025 VELD Music Festival was held from August 1 to 3 at Toronto’s Downsview Park, featuring a lineup spanning EDM, house, techno, and bass, including headliners such as deadmau5, Tiësto, John Summit, Alesso, Rezz, and Dom Dolla. The festival’s production saw significant upgrades: the Sirkus stage received a new overhead structure and 30 % more LED screens, while the Bass stage was outfitted with one-third more screens, increased subwoofer capacity, and—on that stage for the first time—laser systems. Techno was explicitly included in the programming mix, with artists such as Deborah De Luca, Eli Brown, and others booked in that style. VELD 2025 was reviewed more positively than the previous year with fans citing production upgrades, hydration options and the lineup being a large part of that response.

== Setting ==
- Main Stage (capacity of 30,000)
- Bass Stage (capacity of 9,000)
- Sirkus Stage (capacity of 3,000)

== See also ==
- ÎleSoniq Music Festival
- Escapade Music Festival
