= Osheaga Festival =

Annual music festival in Montreal, Quebec

Coordinates: 45°30′34″N 73°31′39″W

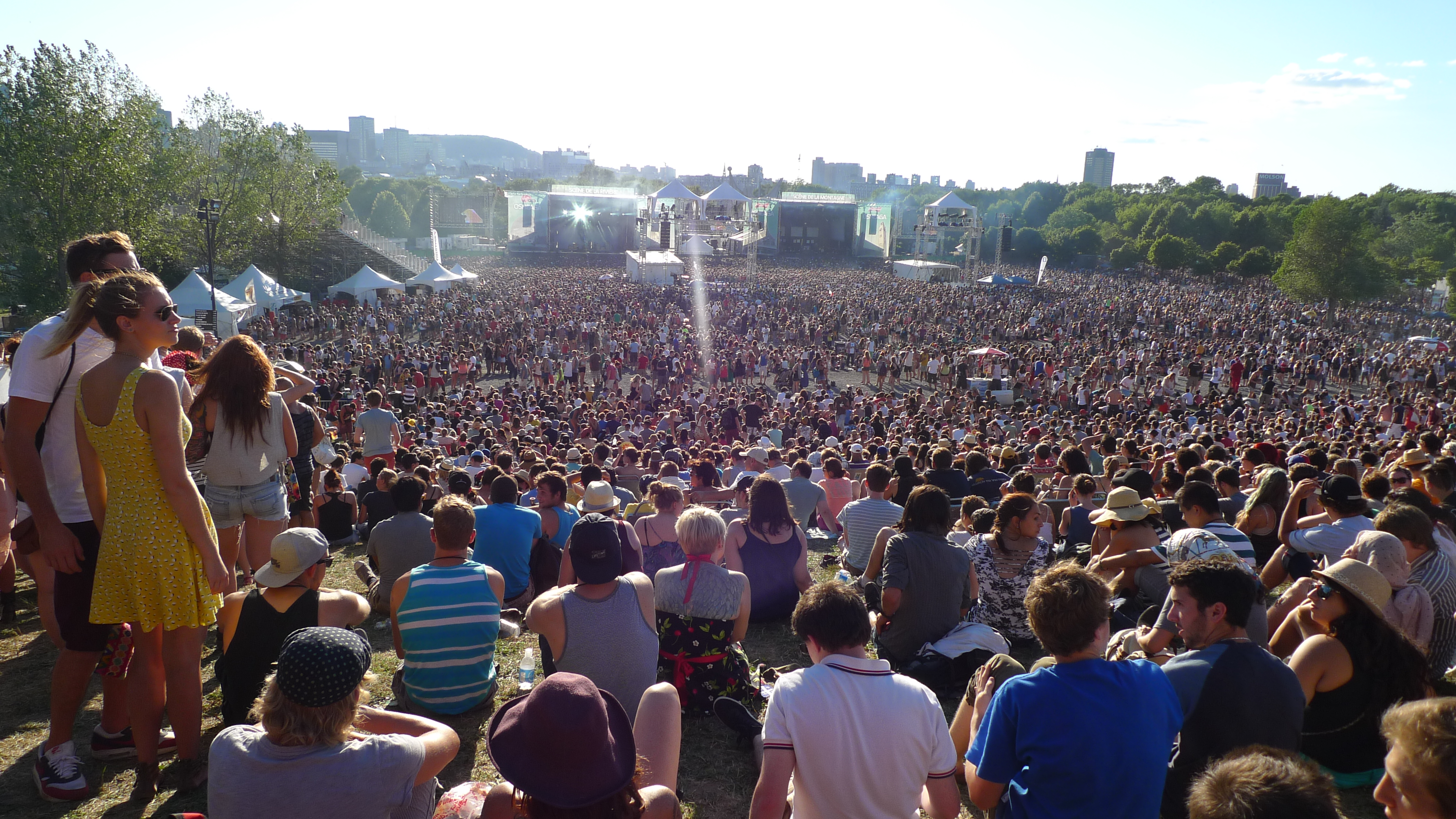
- Genre: Blues, country, electronic dance music, folk, hip-hop, jazz, latin, pop, r&b, rock
- Dates: July 31 – August 2 (2026)
- Locations: Parc Jean-Drapeau, Montreal, Quebec, Canada
- Years active: 2006–present
- Attendance: 151,000 (2026, 3 days total)
- Capacity: 55,000 (all stages combined)
- Website: www.osheaga.com

Osheaga Festival (French: Festival Osheaga) is a multi-day music festival in Montreal, Quebec that is held every summer at Parc Jean-Drapeau on Île Sainte-Hélène. The festival takes place on six different stages with various audience capacities.

Translated from their French equivalents, they are called "River Stage," "Mountain Stage," "Green Stage," "Trees Stage," "Valley Stage," and "Zone Piknic Electronik." Each performance area is paired with a sponsor. Band set times fluctuate based on the status of the performer within the festival. Emerging artists play 30-minute sets, and headliners conclude each day with 90-minute plus sets.

== Etymology ==
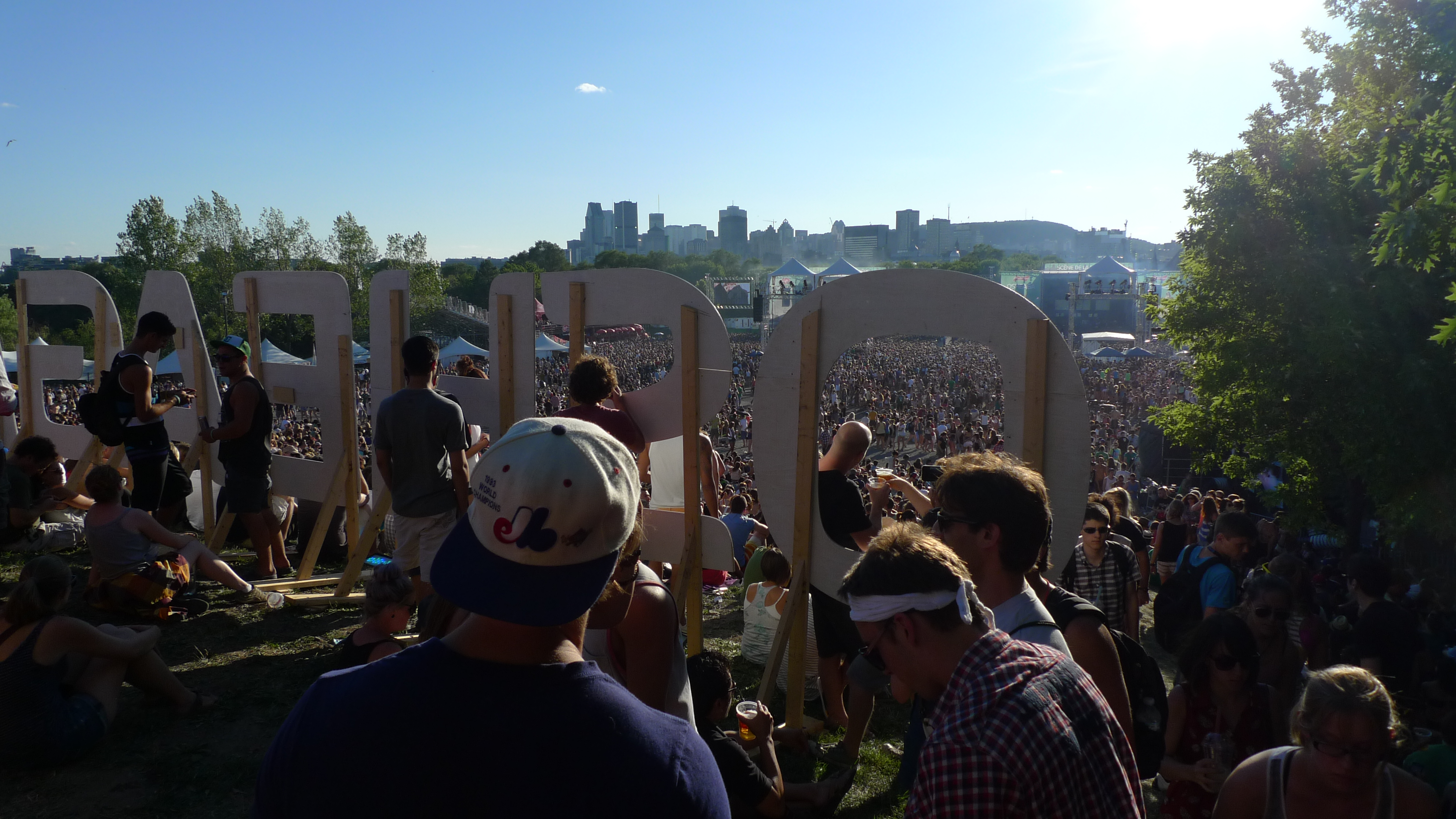
Crowd gathers behind Osheaga sign. The skyline of Montreal can be seen from the Île Sainte-Hélène, where the festival is held.

Osheaga is a title given to the particular region of Canada now known as Montreal. The name is first attested in written records by Jacques Cartier, one of the first European settlers there, when he communicated with the local St. Lawrence Iroquoian people, and recorded the name of their settlement as Hochelaga. Most linguists have ascribed the name to a francisation of either osekare, meaning "beaver path" or "beaver dam", or osheaga, meaning "big rapids" in reference to the nearby Lachine Rapids. An alternative explanation has been claimed in which "Osheaga" meant "people of the shaking hands", tricking Cartier into recording the settlement's name as a word that was actually a mocking comment directed at him; in some versions of this story, the Iroquoian people were bewildered by Cartier waving his hands wildly to attract their attention as he first approached the settlement in his boat, while in others they were bewildered by his European custom of greeting them with a handshake.

These latter explanations are favoured by the Mohawk people at Kahnawake, as in the Mohawk language the phrase "people of the hands" can be expressed as "O she ha ga" or "Oshahaka". They cannot, however, be easily confirmed or refuted, as the few known surviving remnants of the extinct Laurentian language that was spoken by the Iroquoian people at Hochelaga are only moderately similar to the distantly related Mohawk language, which was not spoken anywhere even remotely close to Hochelaga at the time of Cartier's contact.

== History ==
The inaugural edition of Osheaga termed itself a "music and arts festival." It took place on Labour Day weekend, September 2–3, 2006. Nick Farkas, a concert buyer for Gillett Entertainment Group at the time, presented the event. Noticing a lack of similarly themed music venues on the East Coast, Farkas hoped to take advantage of Montreal’s newfound credibility among indie music listeners. "People love Montreal. Let's not kid ourselves—that makes it attractive (to bands), but it's hard for people to take a chance on a first year fest." Farkas attempted to establish a lineup of underground artists that would appeal to both discerning fans and the broader public. Organizers aspired to transform the festival into a destination event. "That's the goal—to get people talking about it, and coming from all over," said Farkas in 2006.

Osheaga's sophomore year began to take stride with the Smashing Pumpkins, M.I.A, Feist, and the Arctic Monkeys. Accordingly, organizers hoped to imitate the previous year's success by hosting an assortment of indie performers. "The fest offers an array of quality, mid-level alternative bands. But put them together—here's the key to Osheaga's success—and you have a headliner by committee." In keeping with the festival's name, Osheaga organizers also incorporated several Montreal-based bands including the Sam Roberts Band, Stars, Dumas, Sixtoo, Pawa Up First, Pony Up, the Royal Mountain Band, Sunday Sinners, and Pas Chic Chic.

Moving to the first weekend in August, the third Osheaga festival broadened its indie appeal by incorporating The Killers, a rock group, and Jack Johnson. Crowds initially complained that Johnson would muddle the festival's persona, but Farkas asserted, "…in (his) philosophy—everything fits." At this point in Osheaga's lifespan, the event was not a financial success. However, the inclusion of more recognizable headliners was intended to draw more expansive crowds. Secondary acts consisted of Metric, The Black Keys, Cat Power, and The Kills. Osheaga 2008 occurred August 2–3 at Jean Drapeau Park, Montreal.

The fourth installation of the festival originally slotted Coldplay and the Beastie Boys as the two-day event's leading performances. However, the Beastie Boys were forced to withdraw after Adam Yauch was diagnosed with a cancerous tumor in his salivary gland. Event organizers filled the opening with Yeah Yeah Yeahs, a then up and coming rock group from Brooklyn. 450 refunds were granted to attendees that requested them. Otherwise, reactions to the set change were positive. Despite these setbacks, the fourth Osheaga festival was the first edition to make a profit. Fifty acts performed on 4 stages from August 1–2, 2009, including Girl Talk, Lykke Li, Jason Mraz, the Decemberists, Arctic Monkeys, and Vampire Weekend.

In its fifth year, Osheaga welcomed Arcade Fire and a host of eclectic sets to its venues. The MEG stage was replaced by the Green stage—a wind and solar powered platform. In keeping with this environmental consciousness, free bike parking and public transit to Jean Drapeau Park was also offered. After the sale of Gillett Entertainment Group, Osheaga fell under the promotion of Evenko. However, Nick Farkas, the company's Vice President of Concerts and Events, continued to head the festival. Roughly 30% of ticket sales in 2010 came from Montreal, 20% from Ontario, and 12% from the United States.

The sixth annual Osheaga festival sold more than 81,000 tickets—more than any previous year. It was also the first three-day incarnation of the event. Eminem closed out the Friday performances, signifying a turning point in the festival's development. 38,000 attendees, the largest single-day crowd seen since Osheaga's inauguration, stretched the venue's 35,000 capacity. Despite the absence of a similarly high-profile performer, the seventh edition of Osheaga in 2012 sold out at 120,000 total attendees over the three-day weekend from August 3–5, 2012. Farkas credited the surge to 2011s big-name lineup and the festival's recognition outside Montreal. Eminem’s performance inflated the festival's presence among American and European markets, making it a destination on an international scale. Headliners in 2012 included The Black Keys, Snoop Dogg, Justice, M83, MGMT, Feist, Sigur Ros, and the Jesus and Mary Chain. However, the once intimate festival layout made for reportedly frustrating navigation among such massive crowds.

In 2013, the festival continued to out-do previous sales, selling out in record time with a total of 135,000 audience members. In fact, 70% of tickets were purchased from outside the Province of Quebec. To accommodate these growing numbers, the site capacity at Jean Drapeau Park was expanded to 45,000. The lineup slated Mumford & Sons, The Cure, and Beck as the main attractions, followed by Phoenix, Imagine Dragons, Vampire Weekend, Macklemore & Ryan Lewis, New Order, The Lumineers, Tegan and Sara, and Kendrick Lamar. Physical organization of the venue continued to present issues in light of foot traffic-prone crowds. "Adequate flow patterns are something we never thought of before," said Farkas. "We were always focusing on the lineup, and making it better than the last year."

Ranked by Pollster as the #1 festival in Canada and the #11 festival in the world, Osheaga has grown significantly since its inauguration. Some have criticized the pronounced commercial presence at 2013's festival; however, those same reviewers admit that the lineup quality has been well maintained since 2006. In total, the festival has presented more than 600 performances to more than 400,000 audience members.

In 2014, the festival added a sixth stage, the Valley Stage. The lineup featured headliners such as OutKast, Jack White, Arctic Monkeys, Skrillex, Lorde and The Replacements.

== Editions ==
Every edition since inception has been held at Montreal's Parc Jean-Drapeau.

=== 2006 ===
The inaugural edition of the Osheaga Festival was held on September 2 and 3, 2006 and was headlined by Sonic Youth and Ben Harper & the Innocent Criminals.

=== 2007 ===
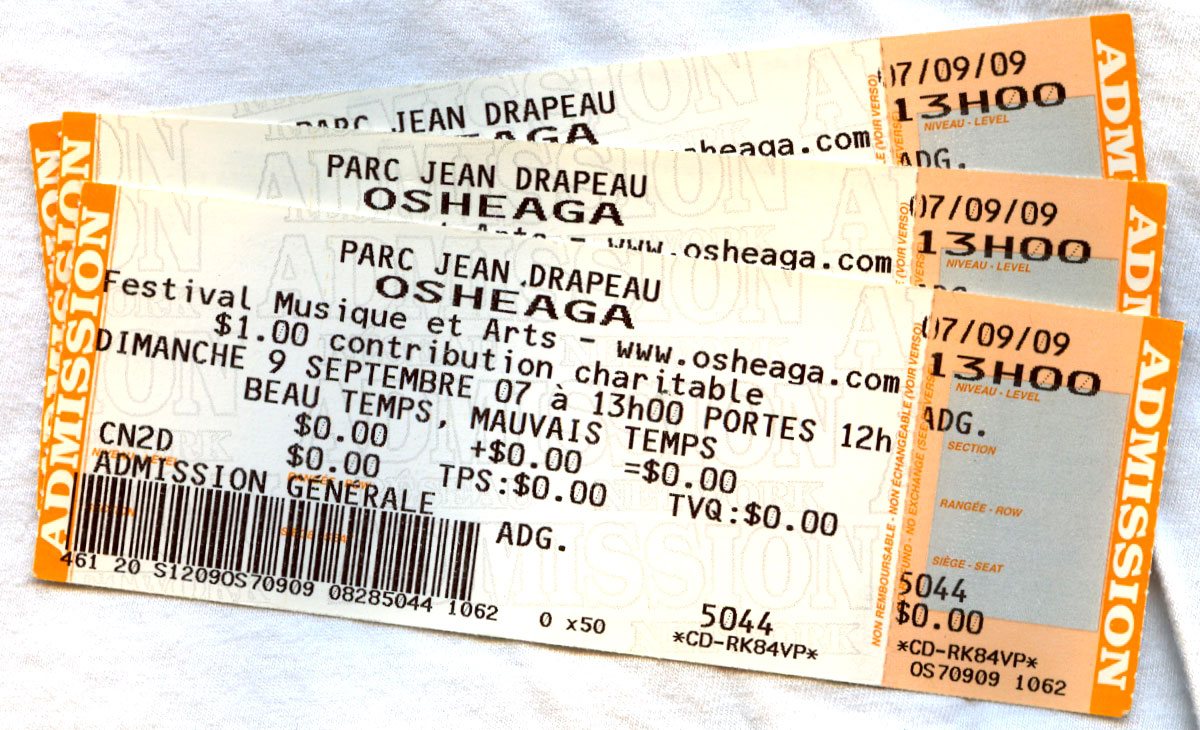
Tickets for the second day of the 2007 edition.

The festival was held on September 8 and 9, 2007 and was headlined by The Smashing Pumpkins and Bloc Party.

=== 2008 ===
The festival was held on August 3 and 4, 2008 and was headlined by The Killers and Jack Johnson.

=== 2009 ===
The festival was held on August 1 and 2, 2009 and was headlined by Coldplay and the Yeah Yeah Yeahs.

=== 2010 ===
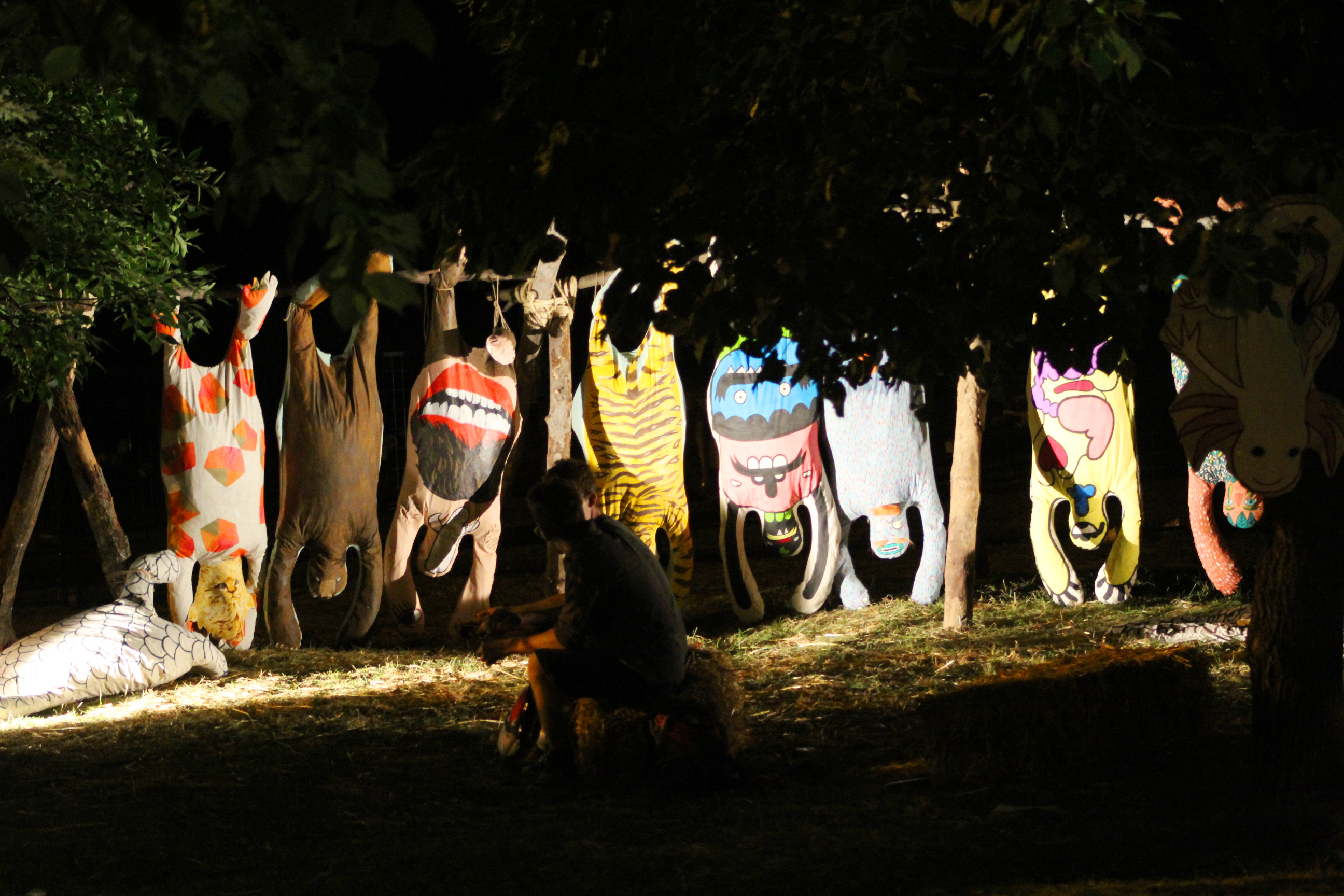
Parc Jean-Drapeau during Osheaga 2010.

The festival was held on July 31 and August 1, 2010 and was headlined by Arcade Fire and Weezer.

=== 2011 ===
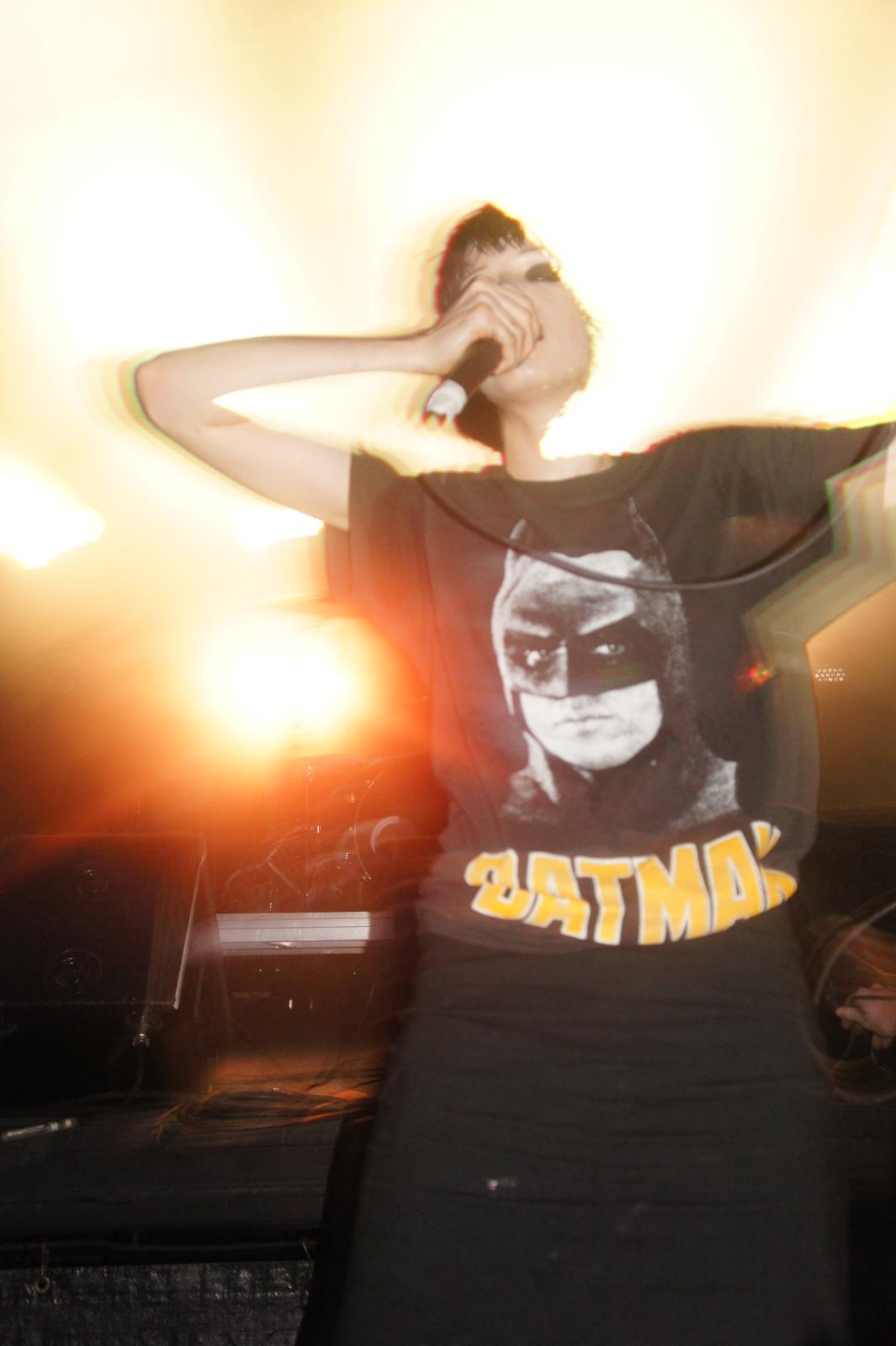
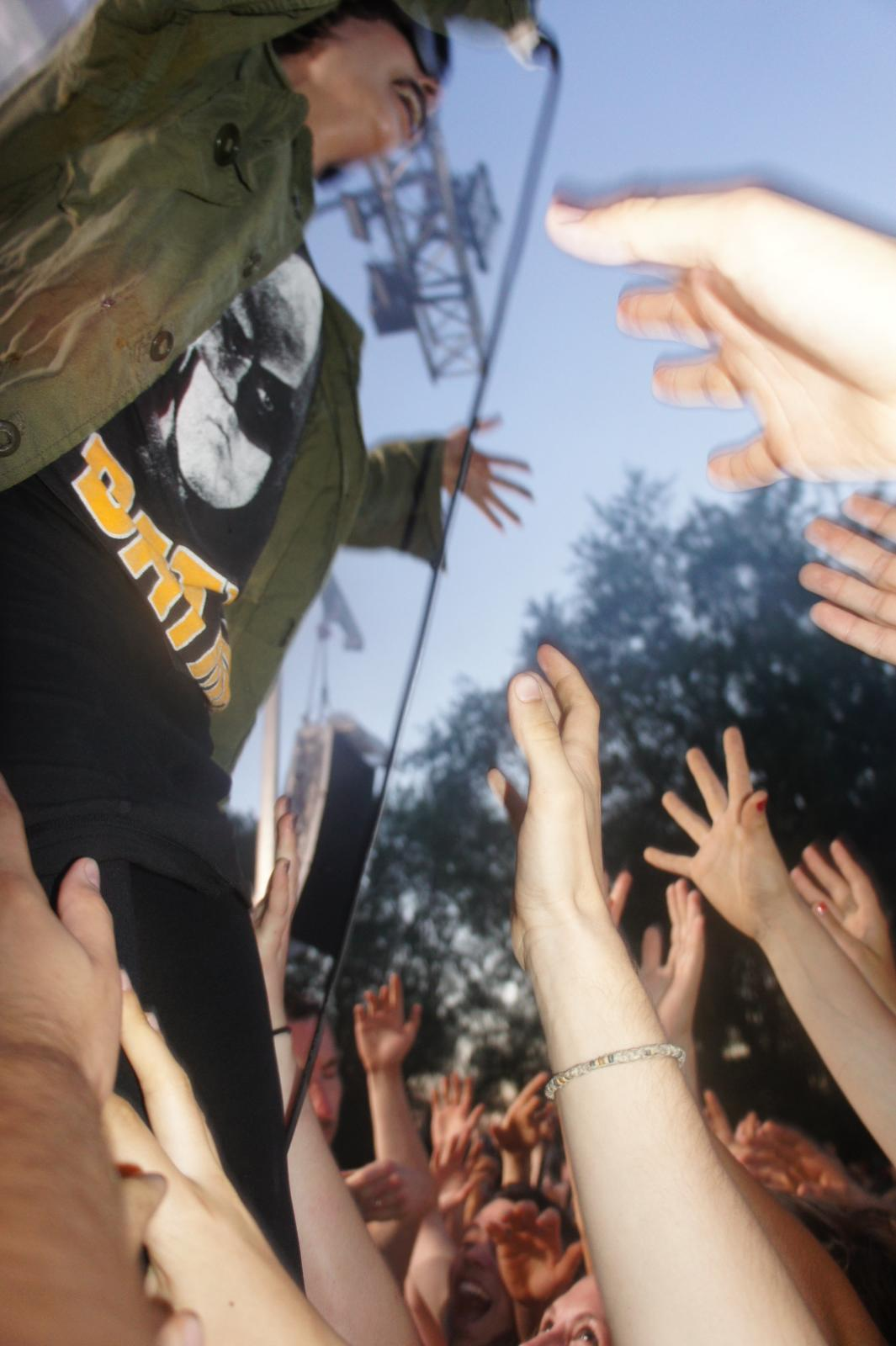
Alice Glass and Ethan Kath of Crystal Castles performs at Osheaga in 2011.

The festival was held on July 29, 30, and 31, 2011, the first edition the festival expanded to a Friday. It was headlined by Eminem, Elvis Costello & The Imposters, and The Flaming Lips.

=== 2012 ===
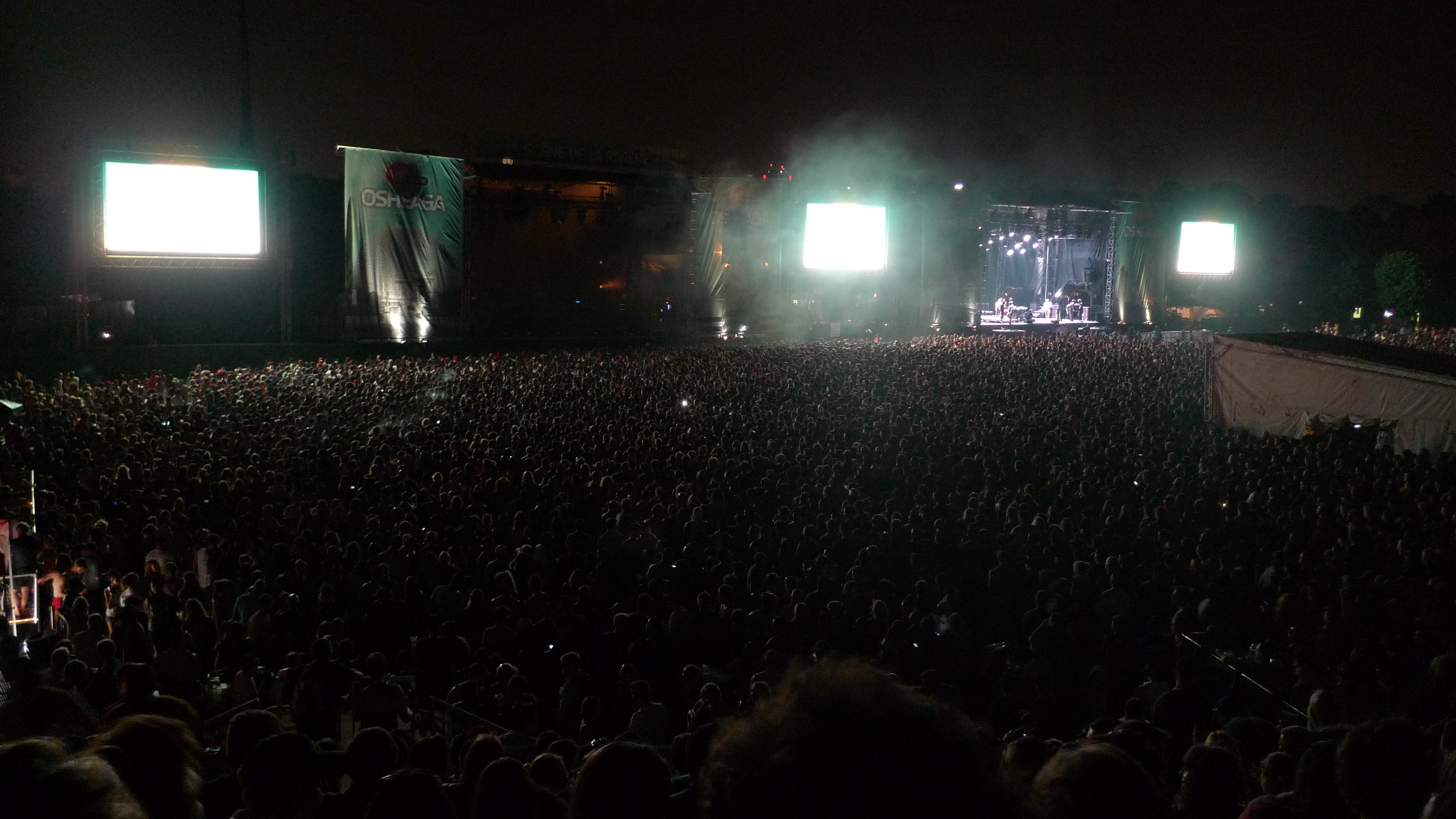
Crowd at night on second day of Osheaga 2012.

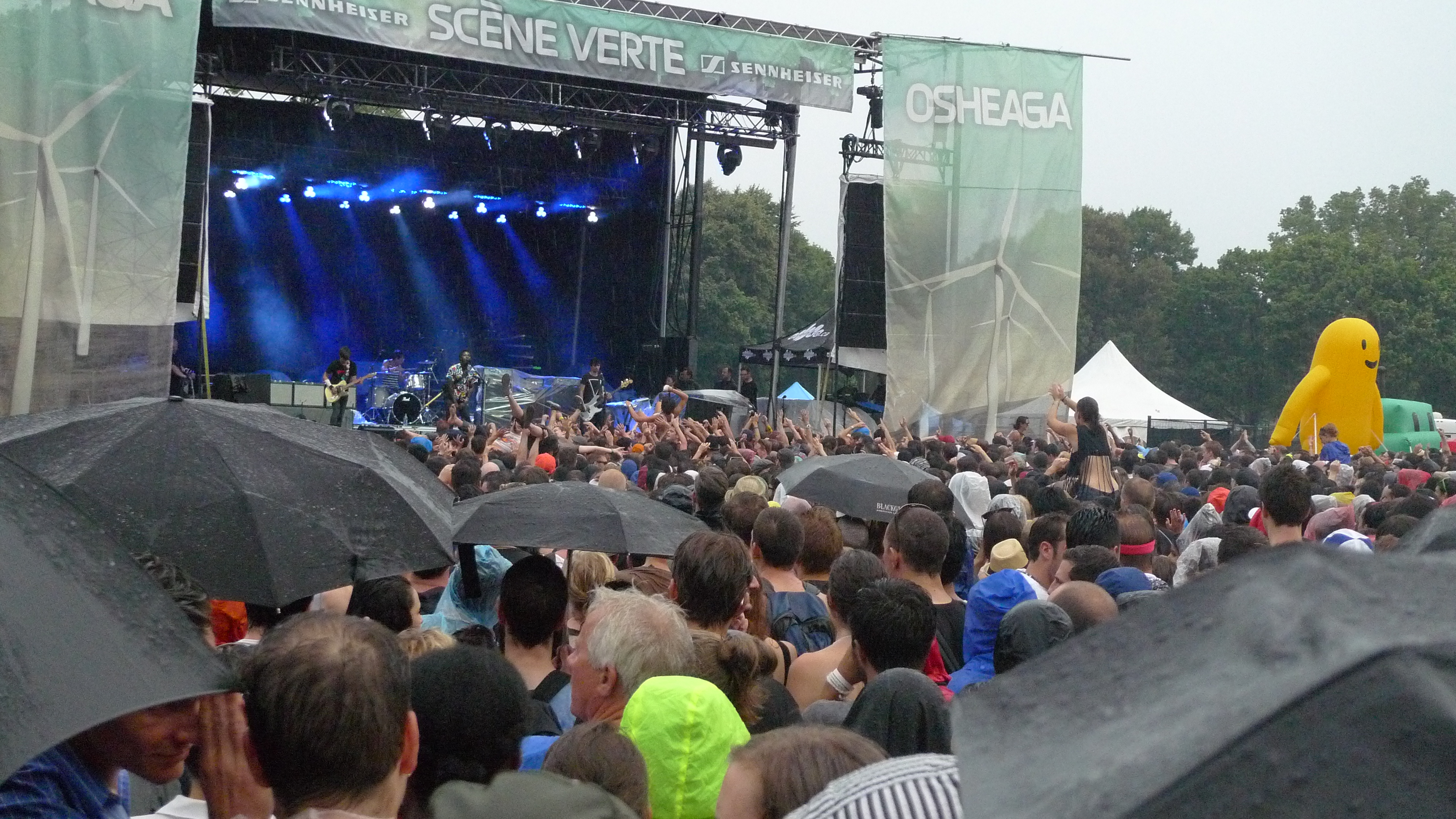
Bloc Party performs on The Green Stage (La scène verte) in 2012.

Osheaga 2012 took place August 3, 4, and 5 and was headlined by Justice, Snoop Dogg, and The Black Keys.

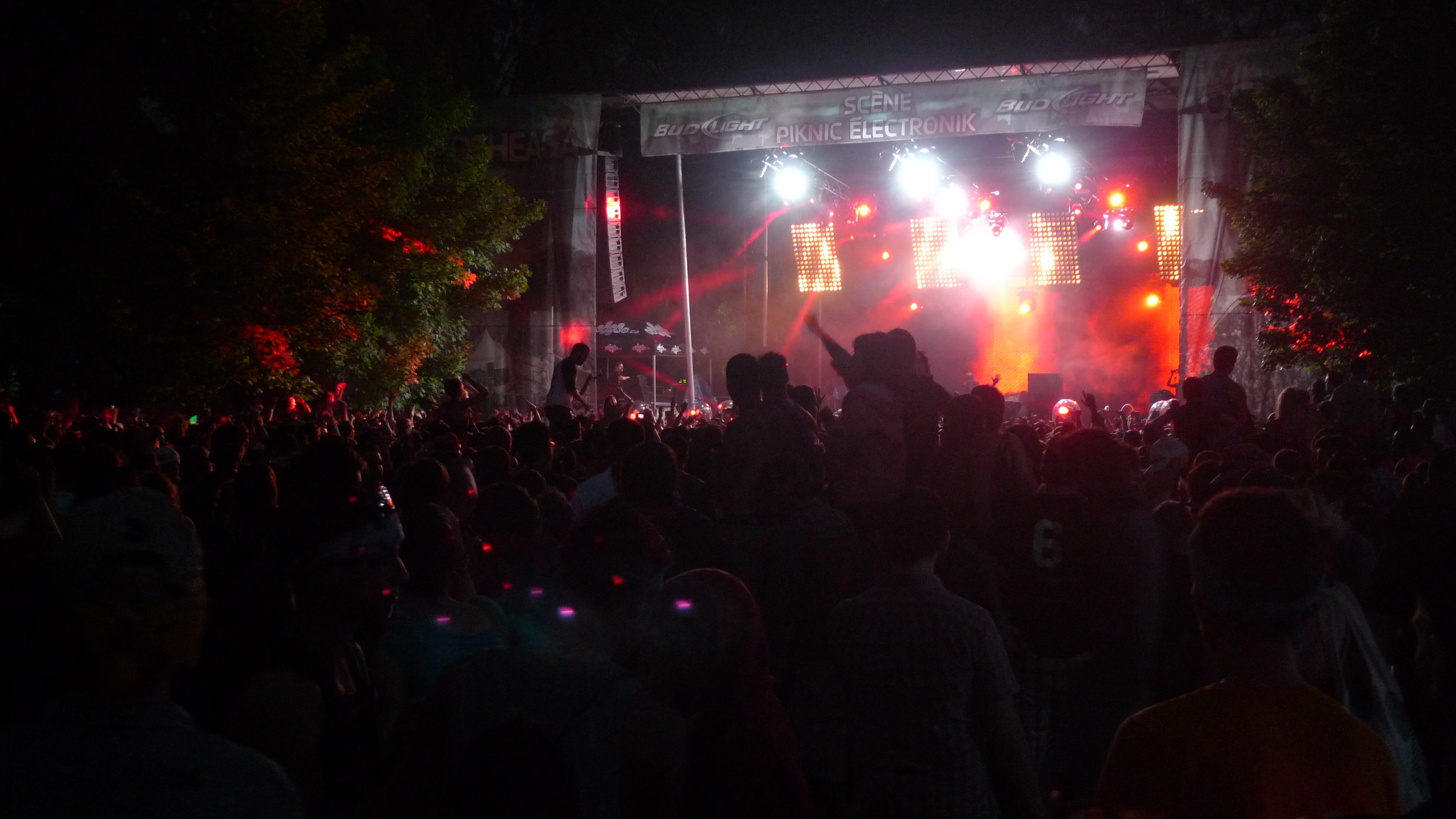
The Piknic Électronik stage, one of several stages where Osheaga artists perform.

The 2012 edition of the festival sold 120,000 tickets in total.

=== 2013 ===
Osheaga 2013 took place August 2 through August 4 and was headlined by The Cure, Beck, and Mumford & Sons.

=== 2014 ===
Osheaga 2014 took place August 1 through August 3 and was headlined by Outkast, Jack White, and Arctic Monkeys.

=== 2015 ===
Osheaga 2015 took place July 31 through August 2 and was headlined by Florence and The Machine, Kendrick Lamar, and The Black Keys.

=== 2016 ===
Osheaga 2016 took place July 29 through July 31 and was headlined by the Red Hot Chili Peppers, Lana Del Rey, and Radiohead.

=== 2017 ===
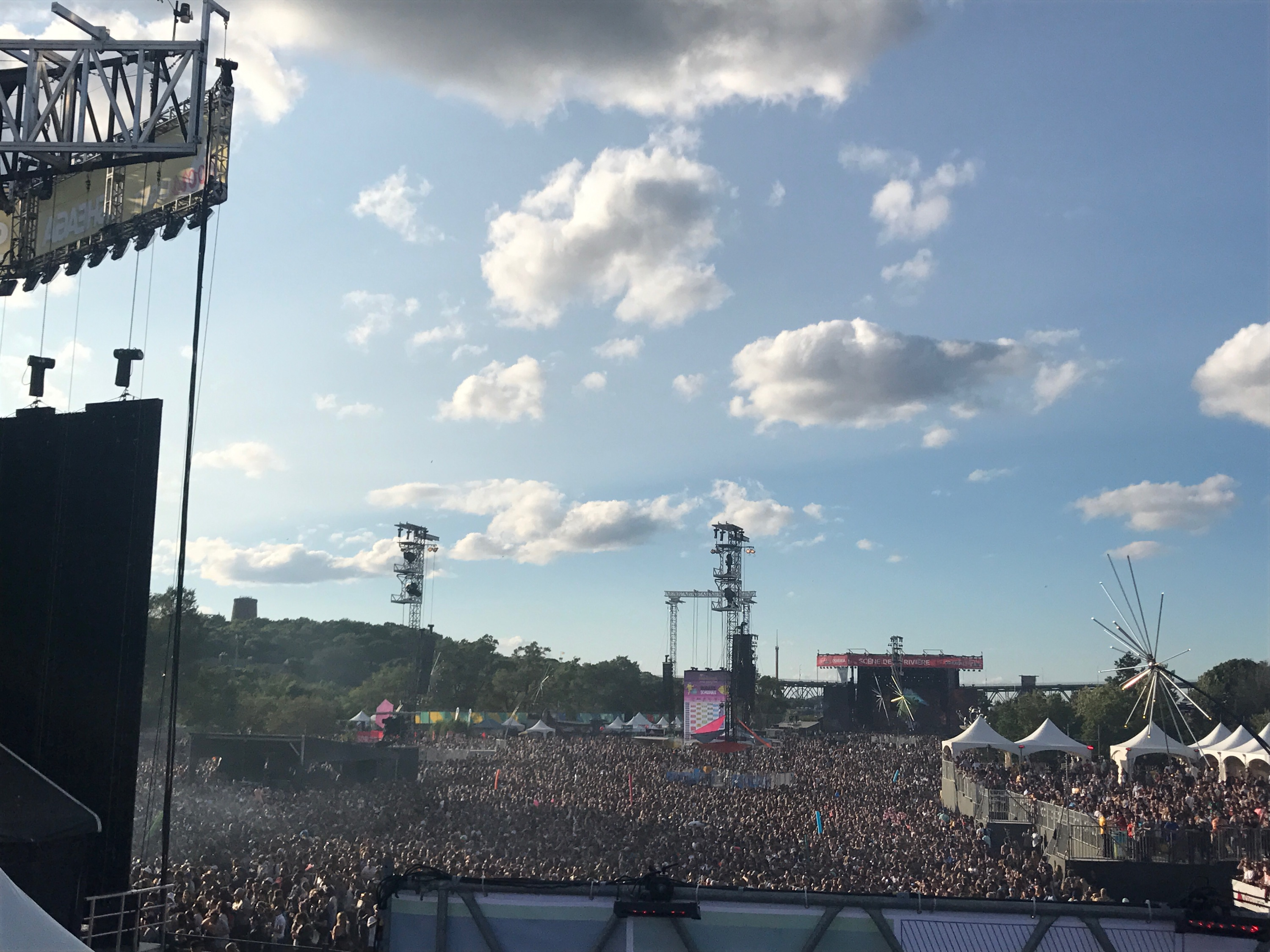
Osheaga crowd during Foster the People's 2017 set on August 6, 2017

Osheaga 2017 took place August 4 through August 6 and was headlined by Lorde, Muse, and The Weeknd. There were some cancellations because of inclement weather and travel difficulties:

=== 2018 ===
Osheaga 2018 took place August 3 through August 5 and was headlined by Travis Scott, Arctic Monkeys, and Florence and The Machine.

=== 2019 ===
Osheaga 2019 took place August 2 through August 4 and was featured by The Lumineers, The Chemical Brothers, and Childish Gambino.

=== 2020 (cancelled due to COVID-19) ===
Osheaga 2020, originally scheduled to take place from July 31 to August 2, was cancelled due to the COVID-19 pandemic.

=== 2021 (cancelled again due to COVID-19) ===
Osheaga 2021 was scheduled to take place from July 30 to August 1. On April 22, 2021, it was announced that the 2021 edition of the festival was cancelled for the second year in a row due to the ongoing COVID-19 pandemic in Quebec.

=== 2021 - Osheaga Get Together ===
Evenko decided to host a mini Osheaga with Canadian artist from October 1 to October 3. This event was headlined by Charlotte Cardin, Jessie Reyez, and Half Moon Run.

=== 2022 ===
Osheaga 2022 took place between July 29 to July 31. The event was headlined by Arcade Fire, Future, and Dua Lipa. The Foo Fighters, who were originally headlined for this edition, were not able to attend due to the passing of the band's drummer Taylor Hawkins.

=== 2023 ===
Osheaga 2023 took place between August 4 to August 6 and was headlined by Rüfüs Du Sol, Billie Eilish, and Kendrick Lamar, with a festival record attendance of 155,000 people over two days.

=== 2024 ===
Green Day performed on August 3 as a part of the Saviors Tour.

=== 2025 ===
Osheaga 2025 took place between August 1 to August 3 and was headlined by The Killers, Tyler, the Creator and Olivia Rodrigo. Inclement weather affected several sets on the second night, most notably those of Gracie Abrams and Tyler, the Creator.

=== 2026 ===
Osheaga 2026 took place between July 31 to August 2, headlined by Twenty One Pilots, Tate McRae and Lorde.

== See also ==
- ÎleSoniq Music Festival, electronic dance music festival at Parc Jean-Drapeau
- Heavy Montréal, music festival at Parc Jean-Drapeau
- Piknic Électronik, weekly electronic music festival at Parc Jean-Drapeau during summer
