= Saint Helen's Island =

Island in Canada

Native name: Île Sainte-Hélène
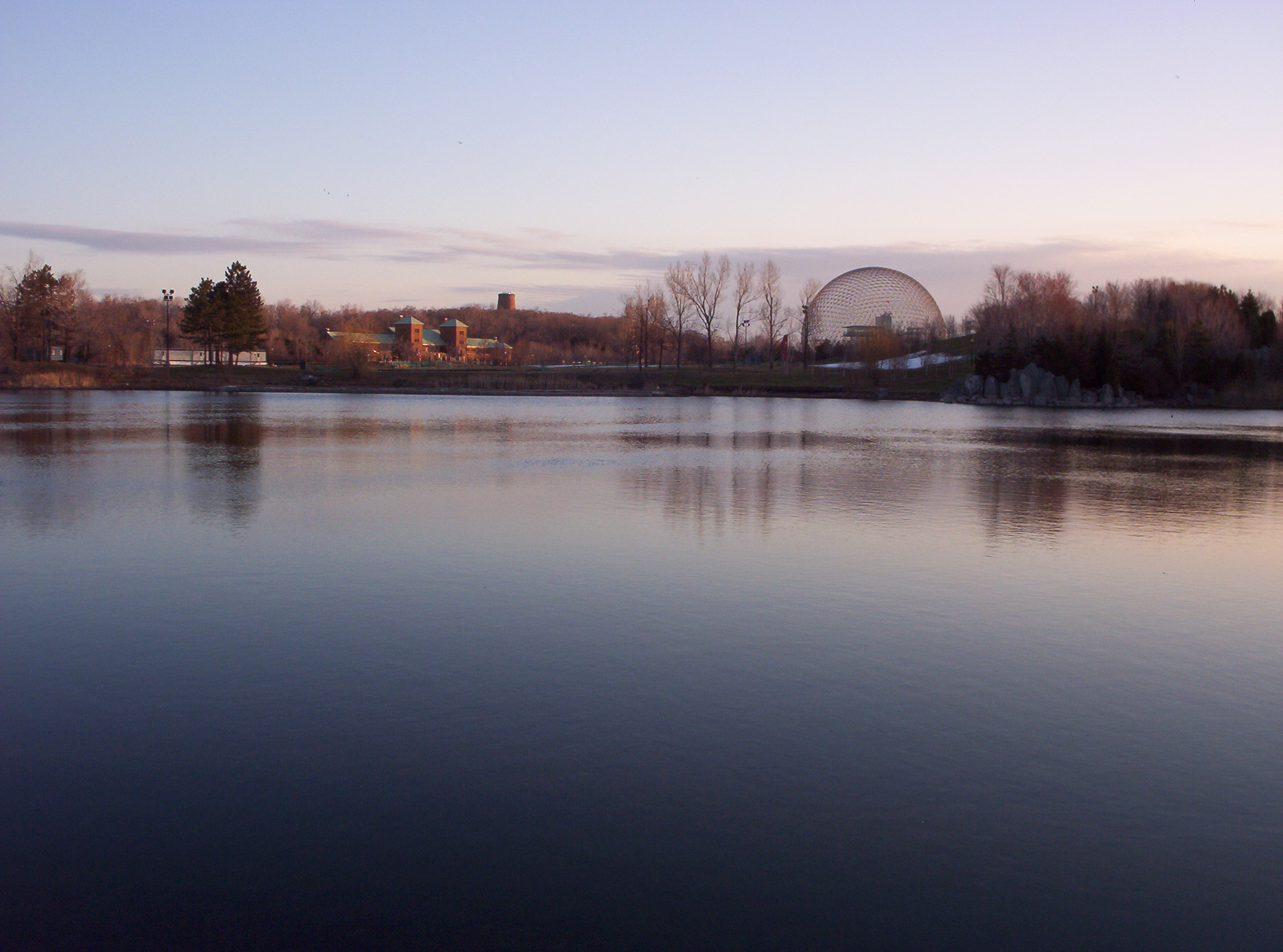
- Saint Helen's Island with the Montreal Biosphere on the right
- Interactive map of Saint Helen's Island

Geography
- Location: Saint Lawrence River
- Coordinates: 45°31′04″N 73°32′02″W
- Archipelago: Hochelaga Archipelago

Administration
- Canada
- Province: Quebec
- City: Montreal
- Borough: Ville-Marie

Demographics
- Population: Uninhabited

Saint Helen's Island (French: Île Sainte-Hélène) is an island in the St. Lawrence River, in the territory of the city of Montreal, Quebec, Canada. It forms part of the Hochelaga Archipelago. It is situated immediately offshore from Old Montreal on the southeastern side of the Island of Montreal in southwestern Quebec, and is part of the central borough of Ville-Marie. The Le Moyne Channel separates it from Notre Dame Island. Saint Helen's Island and Notre Dame Island together make up Jean-Drapeau Park (formerly Parc des Îles).

It was named in 1611 by Samuel de Champlain in honour of his wife, Hélène de Champlain, née Boullé. The island belonged to the Le Moyne family of Longueuil from 1665 until 1818, when it was purchased by the British government. A fort (Saint Helen Island Fort), powderhouse and blockhouse were built on the island as defences for the city, in consequence of the War of 1812.

== History ==
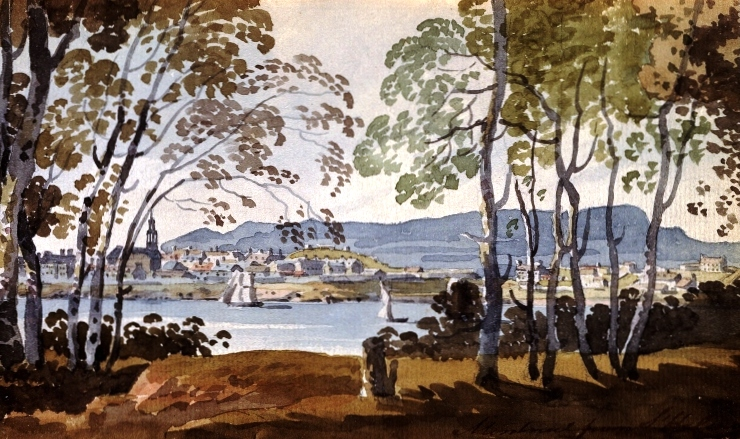
Painting, Montreal from St. Helen's Island by George Heriot, about 1801

In 1838 plans were in place by the British Ordnance Department to establish an observatory, but it was moved to Toronto instead.

The newly formed Canadian government acquired the island in 1870; it was converted into a public park in 1874. The public used it as a beach and swam in the river.

In the 1940s, during World War II, Saint Helen's Island, along with various other regions within Canada, such as the Saguenay–Lac-Saint-Jean and Hull, Quebec had prisoner-of-war camps. St. Helen's prison was number 47 and remained otherwise unnamed just like most of Canada's war prisons. The prisoners of war (POWs) were sorted and classified into categories, including their nationality and civilian or military status. In this camp, POWs were mostly of Italian and German nationality. Also, prisoners were forced into hard labour which included farming and lumbering the land. In 1944, the camp was closed and shortly afterwards destroyed because of an internal report on the treatment of prisoners.

The archipelago of which Saint Helen's Island is a part was chosen as the site of Expo 67, a World's Fair on the theme of Man and His World, or in French, Terre des Hommes. In preparation for Expo 67, the island was greatly enlarged and consolidated with several nearby islands, using earth excavated during the construction of the Montreal Metro. The nearby island, Notre Dame Island, was built from scratch.

After Expo 67, the site continued to be used as a fairground, now under the name Man and His World or Terre des Hommes. Most of the expo installations were dismantled and the island was returned to parkland.

== Visitor attractions ==
Several important attractions are found on the island, including the Saint Helen Island Fort, the La Ronde amusement park, the Biosphere (an interpretative museum about the Saint Lawrence River installed in the former American Pavilion from Expo), and an Aquatic Complex (French: Complexe aquatique de l'île Sainte-Hélène) that includes three exterior pools. The park is a primary recreation site for Montrealers and hosts frequent events, concerts and shows, including the L'International des Feux Loto-Québec international fireworks competition and the annual Osheaga, Île Soniq. and Lasso Montreal music festivals.

During the summer season, there are also live DJs at the Piknic Elektronic on sundays.

St-Helen's island is the also gateway to the Circuit Gilles Villeneuve, a 4,361-metre long car-racing track, located on nearby Notre Dame Island. It has played host to the Canadian Grand Prix since 1978.

== Transportation ==
The island can be accessed by public transit, by car, by bicycle or by foot. The Concordia Bridge links St. Helen's Island to Montreal's Cité du Havre neighbourhood on the Island of Montreal as well as Notre Dame Island (which itself is connected to Saint-Lambert on the south shore by bicycle paths). The island is also accessible via the Jacques Cartier Bridge from both the Island of Montreal and Longueuil on the south shore. The Yellow Line of the Montreal Metro has a stop on St. Helen's Island: Jean-Drapeau station.

== Gallery ==
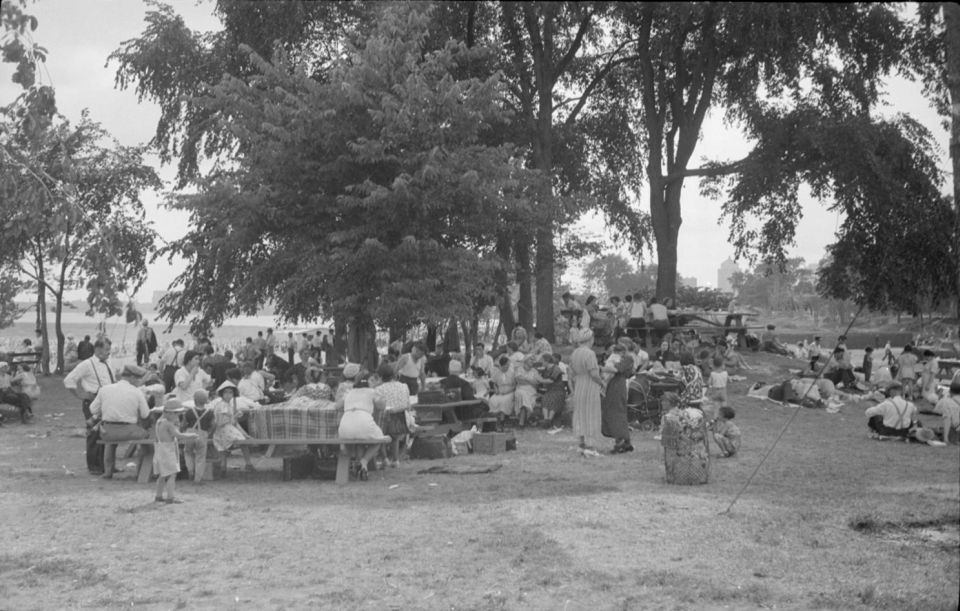
Picnic on Saint Helen's Island, 1938

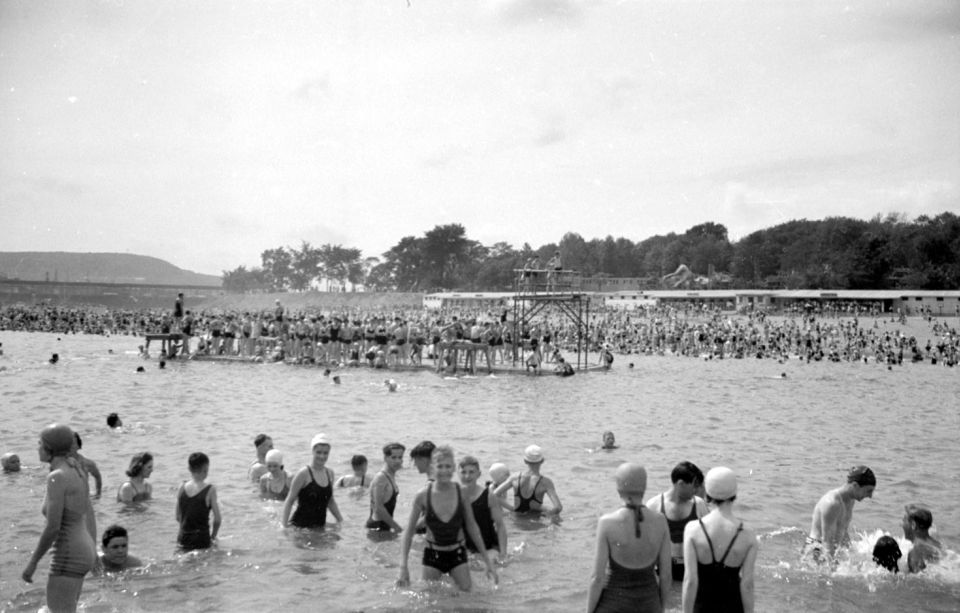
Beach scene, 1938

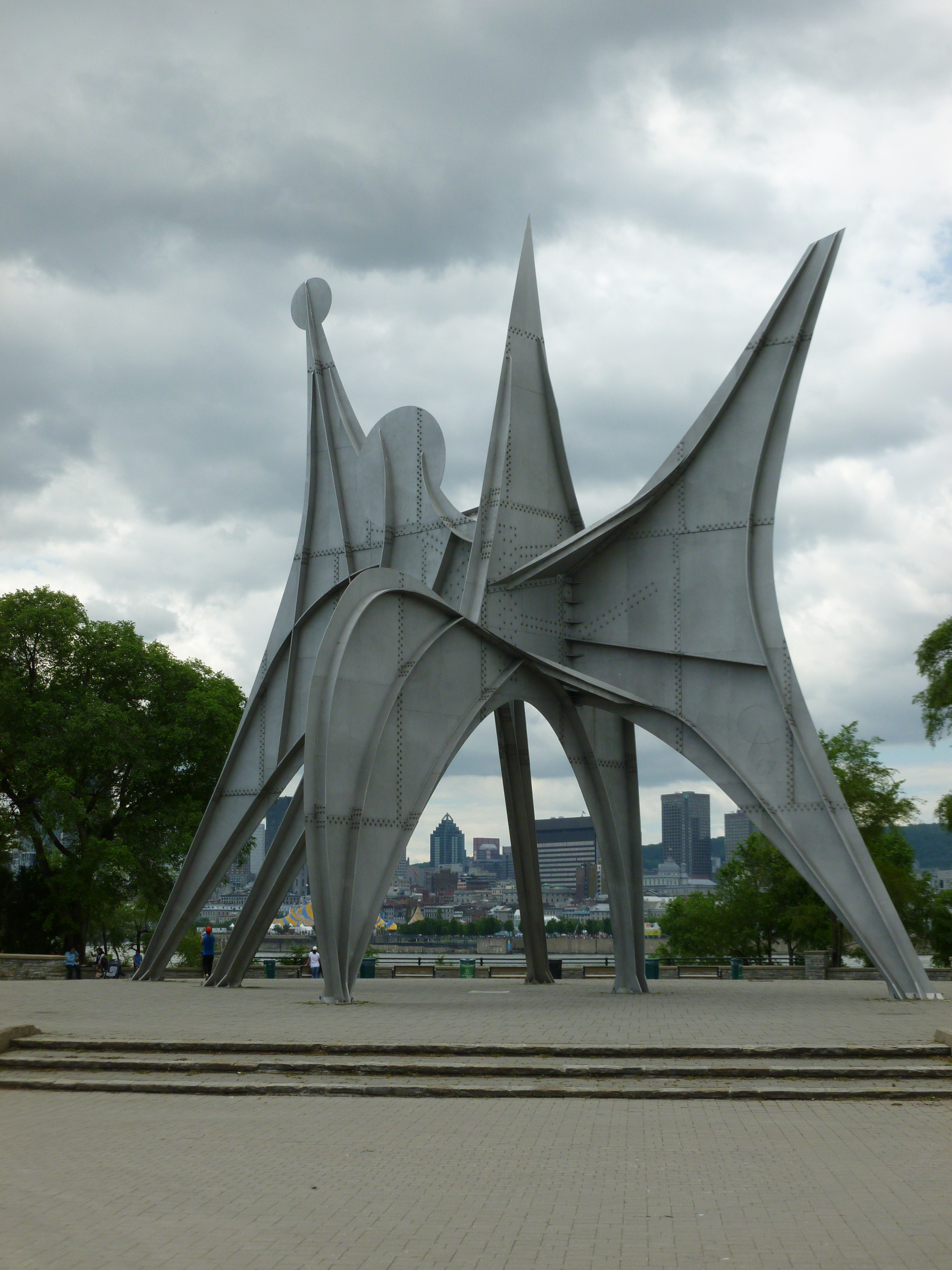
Lee Trois Disques, a sculpture by Alexander Calder, on Saint Helen's Island

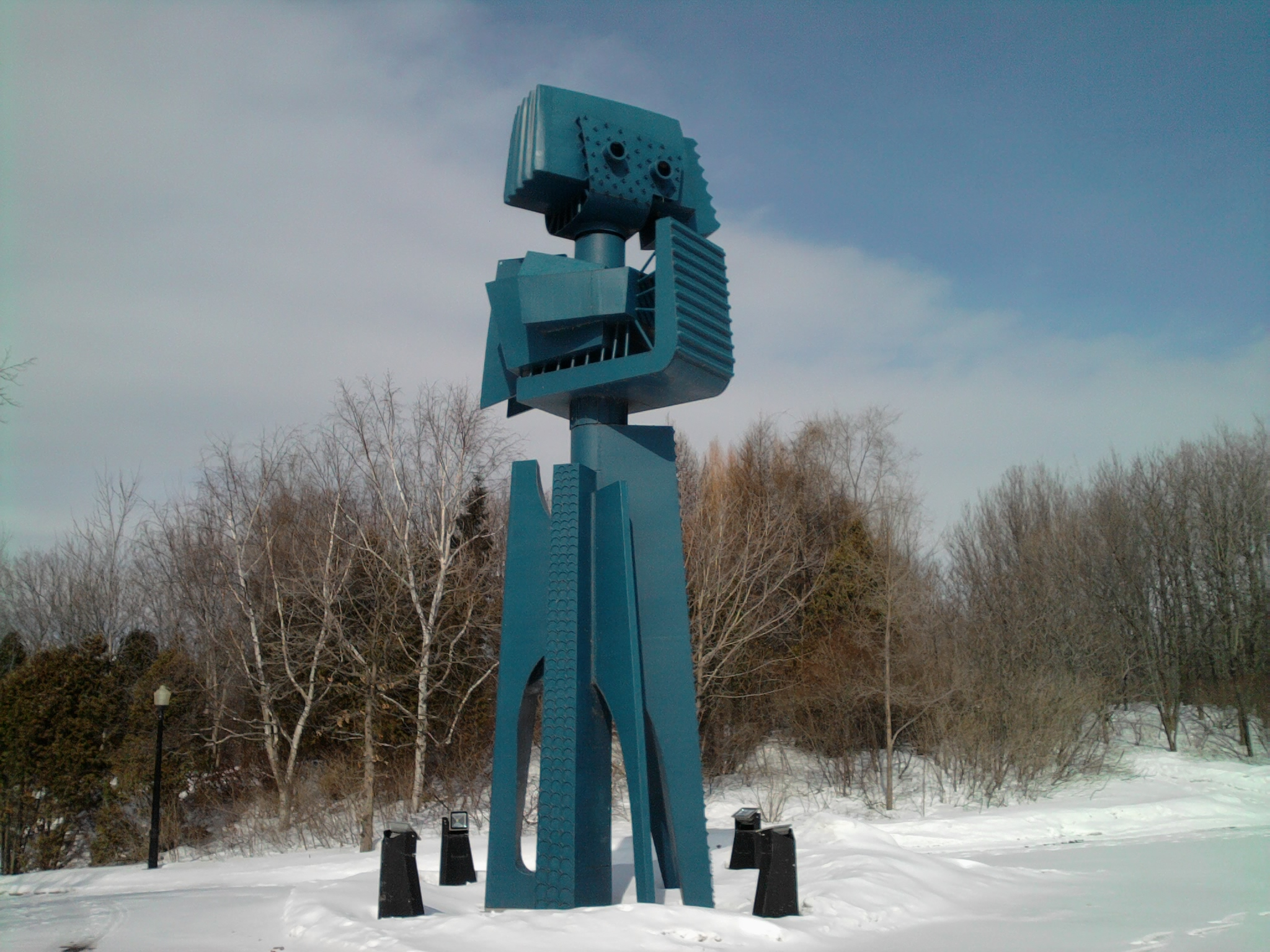
"Le Phare du Cosmos" (1967) by Yves Trudeau (created for Expo 67) in Saint Helen's Island

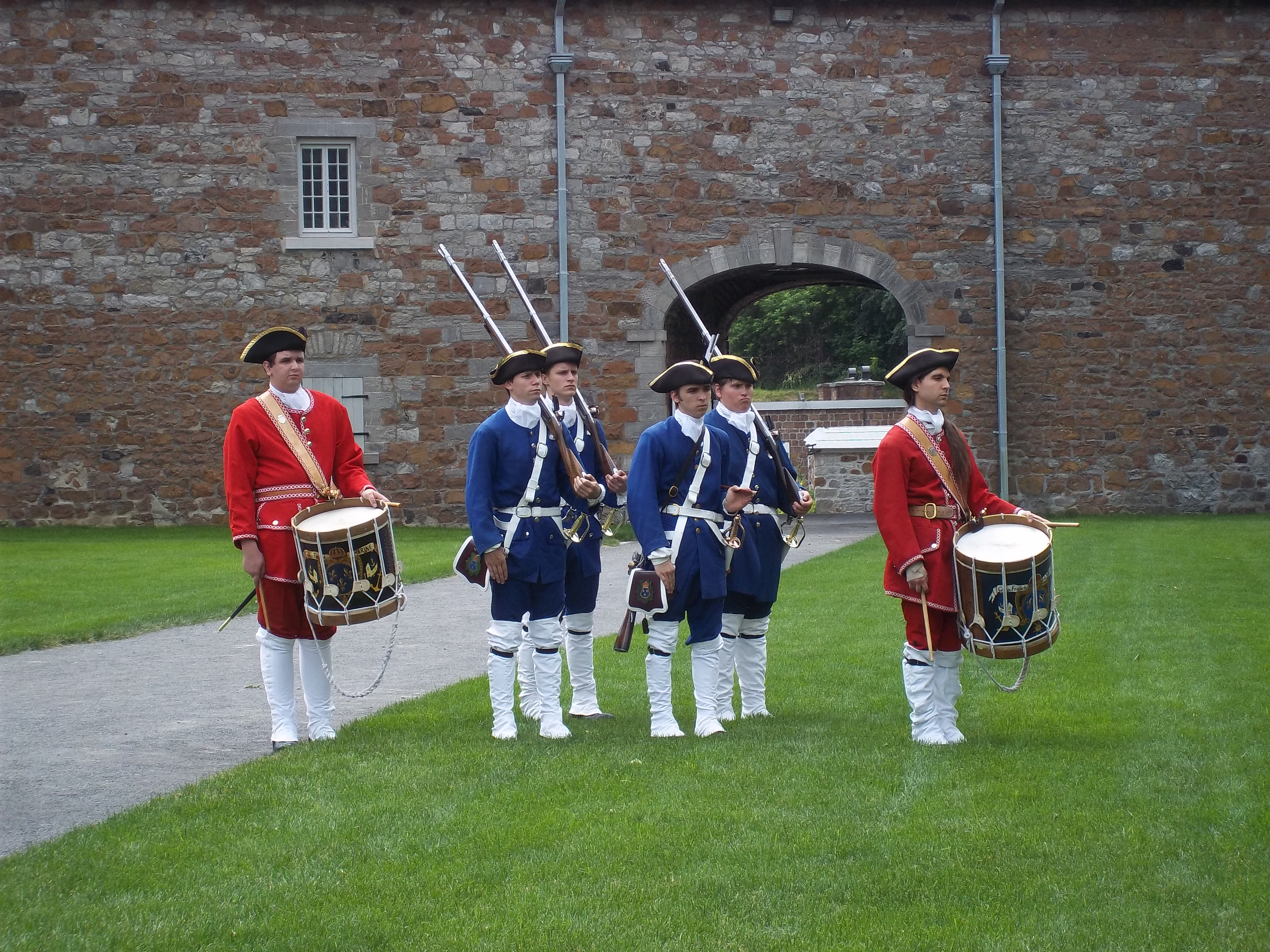
The Saint Helen Island Fort

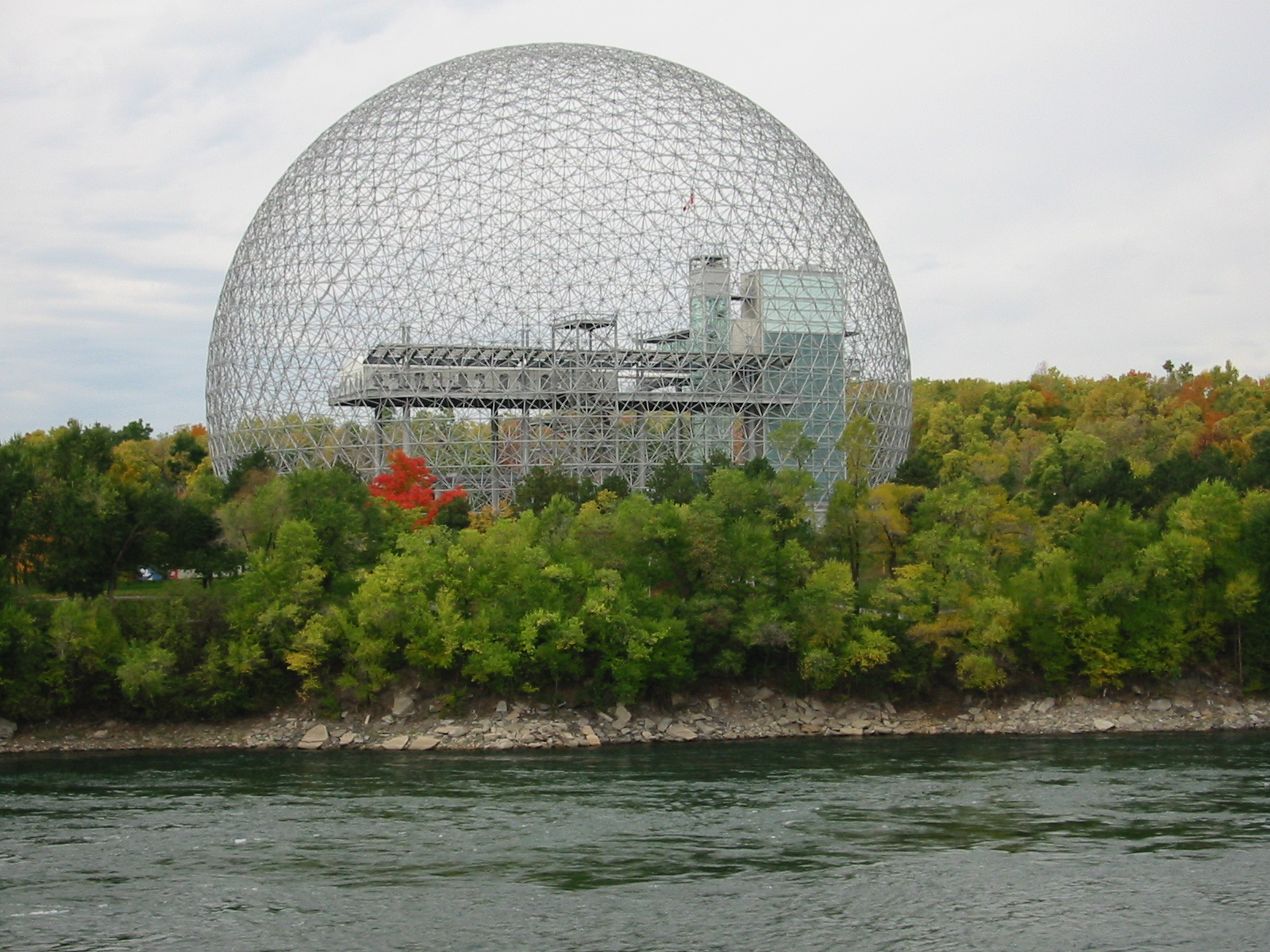
The Montreal Biosphere

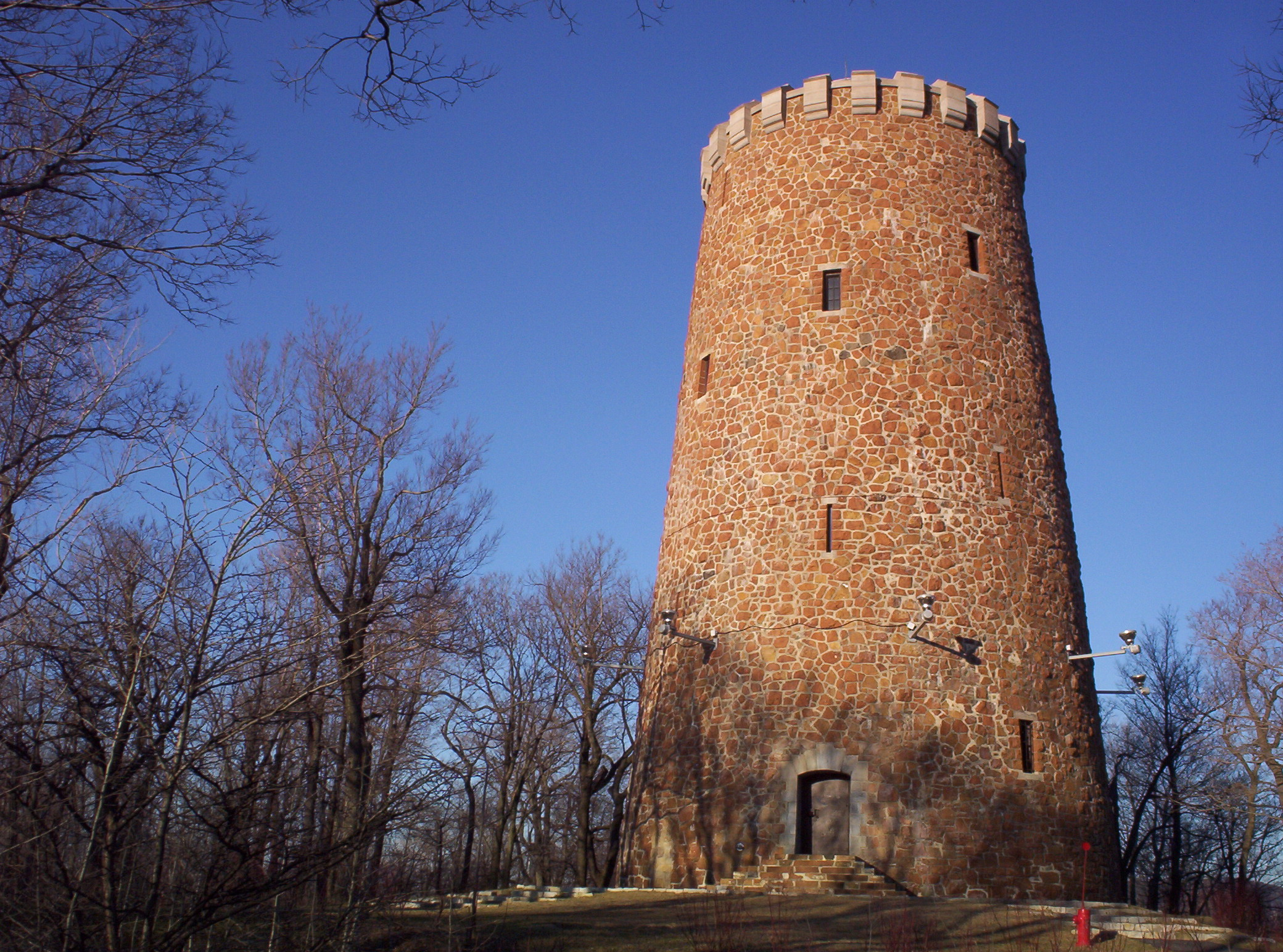
The Tour de Lévis

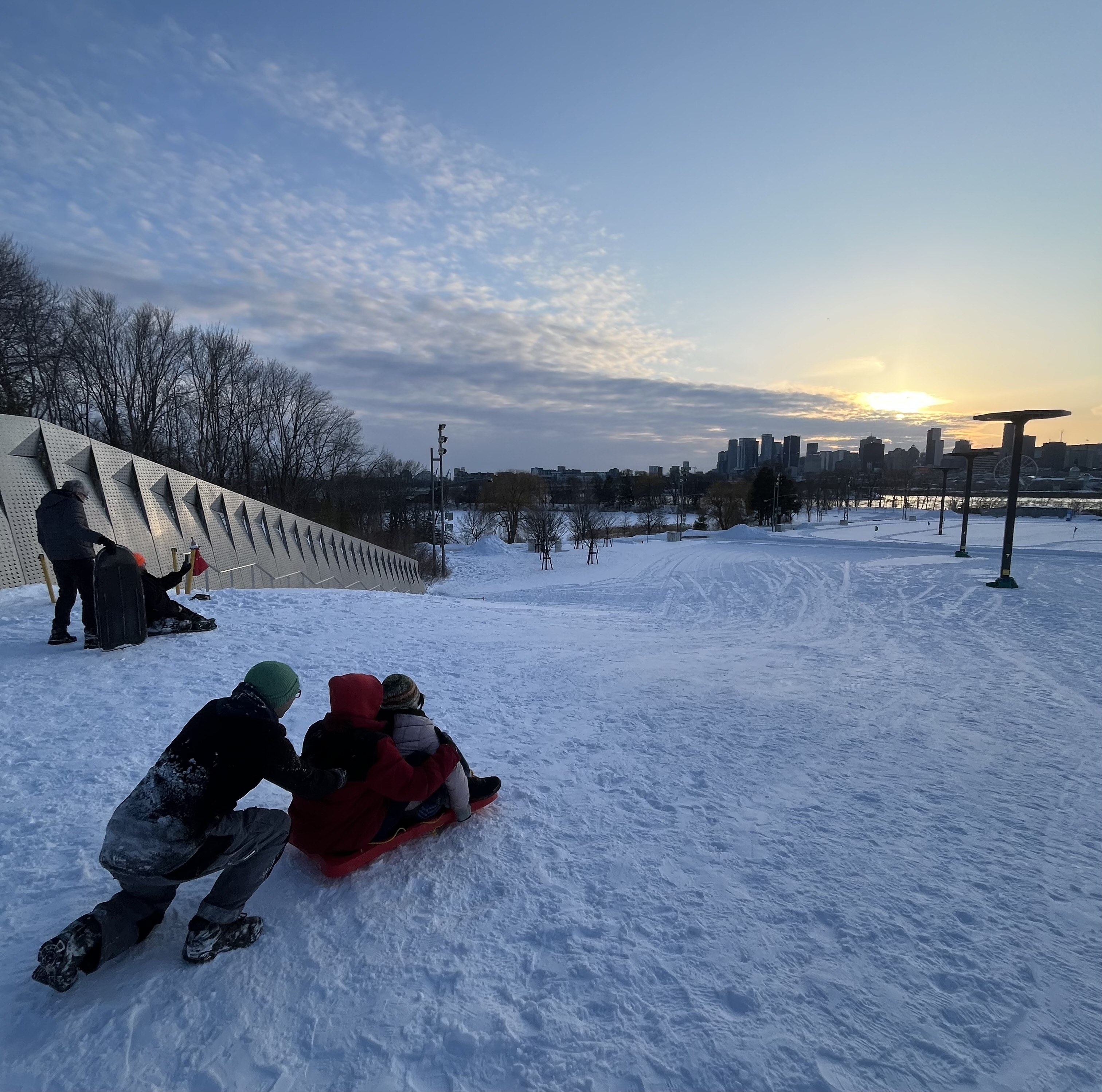
Sledding on Saint Helen's Island

== See also ==
- List of islands of Quebec

== Sources ==
- Young, Richard (1980), Blockhouses in Canada, 1749–1841: a Comparative Report and Catalogue., Occasional Papers in Archaeology and History, Canadian Historic Site
