= Piknic Électronik =

Canadian weekly music festival

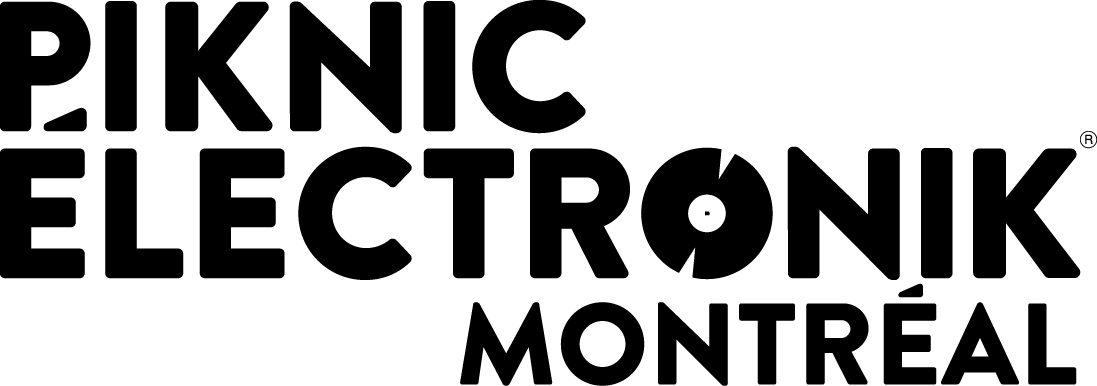
- Official Logo of Piknic Électronik
- Genre: Electronic music
- Locations: Montreal; Barcelona; Melbourne; Santiago; Austin; Dubai
- Years active: 2003–present
- Attendance: 178,000 (2022)
- Website: Official site

Piknic Électronik is a weekly electronic music festival which takes place every Sunday during the summer in Montreal, Quebec. Established in 2003, the festival takes place at Parc Jean-Drapeau, only ten minutes outside of Downtown Montreal, and features local and international DJs and producers. The festival concentrates on house and minimal techno genres, but has recently shifted to an EDM style of programmation. The event runs from 2pm - 9:30pm.

In 2013, Piknic Électronik expanded to Barcelona, with other local editions of the festival beginning in Melbourne and Dubai in 2014, in Santiago in 2015, and in Paris in 2019. An annual, one-weekend-only edition of Piknic Électronik is also held in Austin, Texas, as of 2018.

In 2017, 112,000 individuals attended the original Montreal edition of the festival. In 2018, 129,243 festival-goers attended. As of 2018, over one million people have attended Montreal's Piknic Électronik over its 16 seasons.

In addition to music, attendees are also encouraged to picnic: a variety of food and drink options are available at the park.

== Rules ==
There are various guidelines that everyone must follow. Bringing drugs or consuming narcotics is strictly prohibited. The event is open to all, furthermore, minors may come to the event. Minors are allowed in, but alcohol may not be served to anybody under the legal age.

Besides identified MIRA dogs, animals are forbidden from the venue.

People may not bring any type of musical instrument of their own, as all of the music-making should be solely up to the on-stage artists.

Piknic Electronik has a friendly and inclusive vibe, therefore, the event does not allow anybody to sell, sample or hand-out promotional items.

== Payment and ticketing ==
Planning ahead may make the overall experience more seamless. People may reserve seats ahead of time to avoid long lines. The website has a section called “ticketing” where people can purchase their tickets online. Pre sale tickets can be purchased online in early May and children under 12 years enter for free. In any case, tickets may be purchased directly at the venue, however, there may be a higher wait time. There will are also ATM machines nearby.

== Site information ==
There are two main stages at the venue and several bars and restrooms surrounding the site. There is an area in the centre with picnic tables to eat, drink as well as an outdoor volleyball court near the smaller stage. In past years, Vidéotron and National Bank of Canada have sponsored the event. Parc Jean Drapeau, where the event takes place, is located east of downtown Montreal along the Saint Lawrence River.

The event is also accessible to those with reduced mobility however there is no specifically reserved area. There are accessible restrooms as well.

== Transportation ==
The site is located within walking distance of Metro Jean-Drapeau on the yellow line. The site is also accessible by bus, details of which can be found here on Montreal's public transportation website, STM. While bicycles are not allowed on site, there are bike locking stations available outside the site. There are also three designated parking areas for cars.

== Petit Piknic ==
Piknic Electronik Montreal offers free Petit Piknic programming aimed at children and families on multiple afternoons throughout the summer season between noon and 3 PM. Aside from specialized music programming, the festival organizes games and other age-appropriate activities, as well as noise-cancelling headphones for children. Regular Piknic Electronik programming is also available free for children under the age of 12.

== Commitment to sustainable development ==
Piknic Électronik is committed to acting in a green manner. The Montréal festival has committed to various initiatives. Below are some of the commitments according to the festival's website:

- All dishes are either recyclable or compostable.
- Reusable cup program.
- A presence on sustainable development initiatives and social reintegration programs.

== See also ==
- List of electronic music festivals
- Osheaga Festival, music festival at Parc Jean-Drapeau
- ÎleSoniq Music Festival, music festival at Parc Jean-Drapeau
- Heavy Montreal, music festival at Parc Jean-Drapeau
