= Saint Helen Island Fort =

Historic fort in Montreal, Quebec

Coordinates: 45.5197°N 73.5360°W

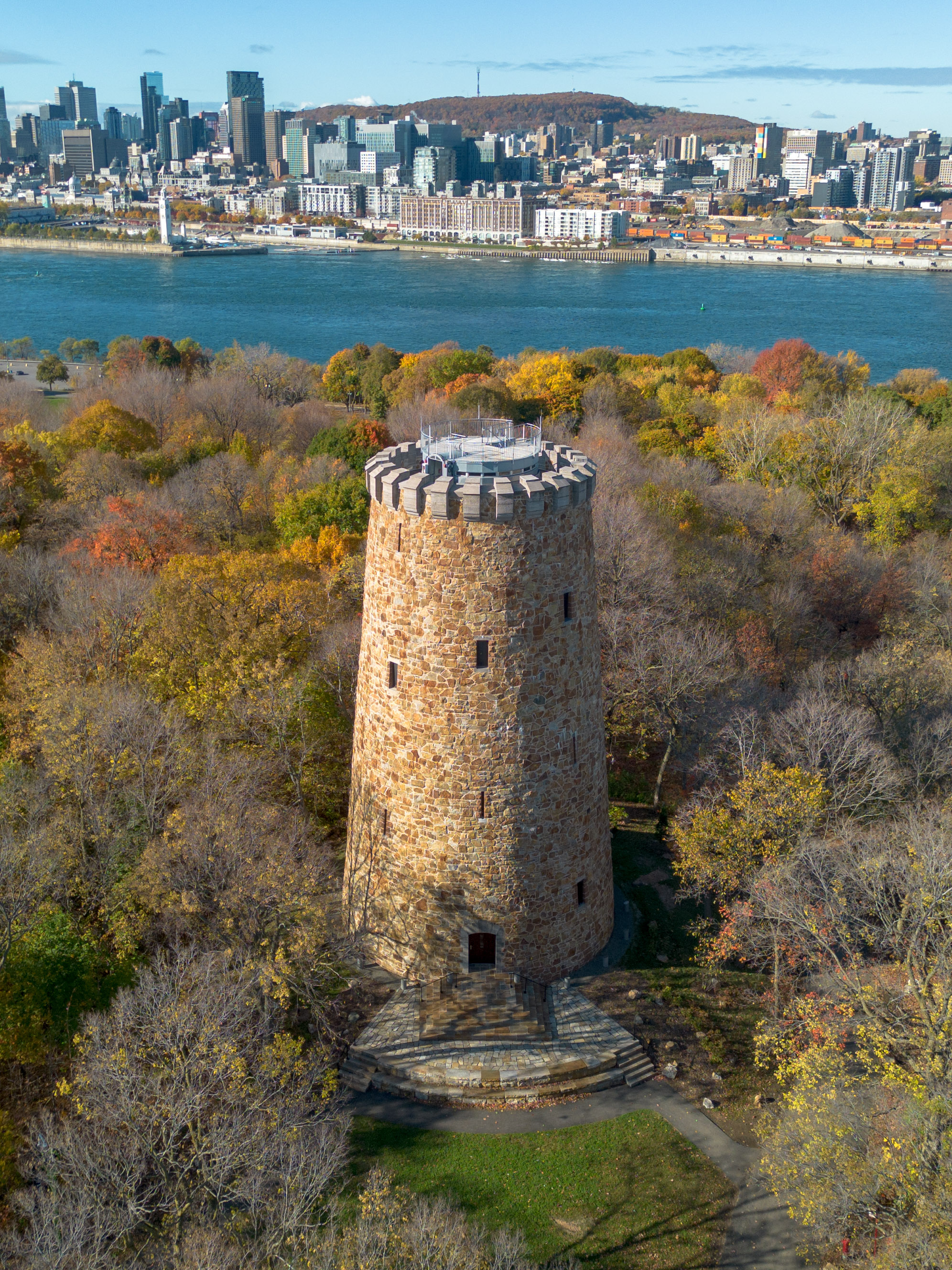
- Lévis Tower in 2025
- Established: 1955
- Location: Montreal, Quebec, Canada
- Type: historical fort

The Saint Helen Island Fort (French: Fort de l'Île Sainte-Hélène), a historic site on Saint Helen's Island in the city of Montreal, Quebec, was constructed in the early 1820s as an arsenal in the defensive chain of forts built to protect Canada from a threat of American invasion. Although not heavily fortified, it served an important purpose as the central artillery depot for all forts west, and in the Richelieu River Valley, known as the Valley of the Forts. These included Fort Henry and Fort Lennox. The red stone used to build the Fort is a breccia quarried on the island, which is situated in the St. Lawrence River between the island of Montreal and the south shore.

The Levis Tower, contrary to popular belief, was not part of the fortifications on the island. It was built in the 1930s to house a water tower.

== History ==
Built between 1820 and '24 by the British, the fort served as arsenal and a storage facility for weapons and equipment. It was transformed into a military prison after the rebellions of 1837. The complex was however ravaged by fire in 1848, only to be rebuilt in 1863 and '64.

After the British Army left the fort for ruin, it became part of the City of Montreal. In the 1930s, it was restored as part of a job creation project during the Great Depression. During the Second World War, it was used as an internment camp for Italians who were in the UK at the time of the declaration of war. During the summer months the Fort houses two reconstituted 18th century regiments, The Olde 78th Fraser Highlanders, and Les Compagnies Franches de la Marine.

== Stewart Museum (1955-2021) ==
The Fort was also home to the Stewart Museum (French: Musée Stewart), a private non-profit institution and history museum founded in 1955 by philanthropist David M. Stewart to collect, store and display historical artifacts from Canada's colonial past, particularly that of New France. It had a unique collection of close to 27,000 artifacts, archival documents and rare books related to the European history of North America, from the establishment of New France up to the present day. The museum’s chief mission was to preserve and showcase these artifacts that bore witness to the voyages of exploration, scientific advances, feats of arms, beliefs and daily lives of our ancestors. The former museum, located in Parc Jean-Drapeau, had been housed in the arsenal of the fort on St. Helen’s Island, a 19th-century military building that is listed in the Répertoire du patrimoine culturel du Québec. Both the Fort and the museum had been open year-round, before its eventual closure.

On February 16, 2021, after 66 years of operation, the museum permanently closed. Unable to survive financially due to the COVID-19 pandemic, its collection will be relocated and merged with the McCord Museum in downtown Montreal.

== Access ==
The Fort itself has been closed to the public since February 2021.
