= ÎleSoniq Music Festival =

Electronic dance music festival in Montreal, Quebec

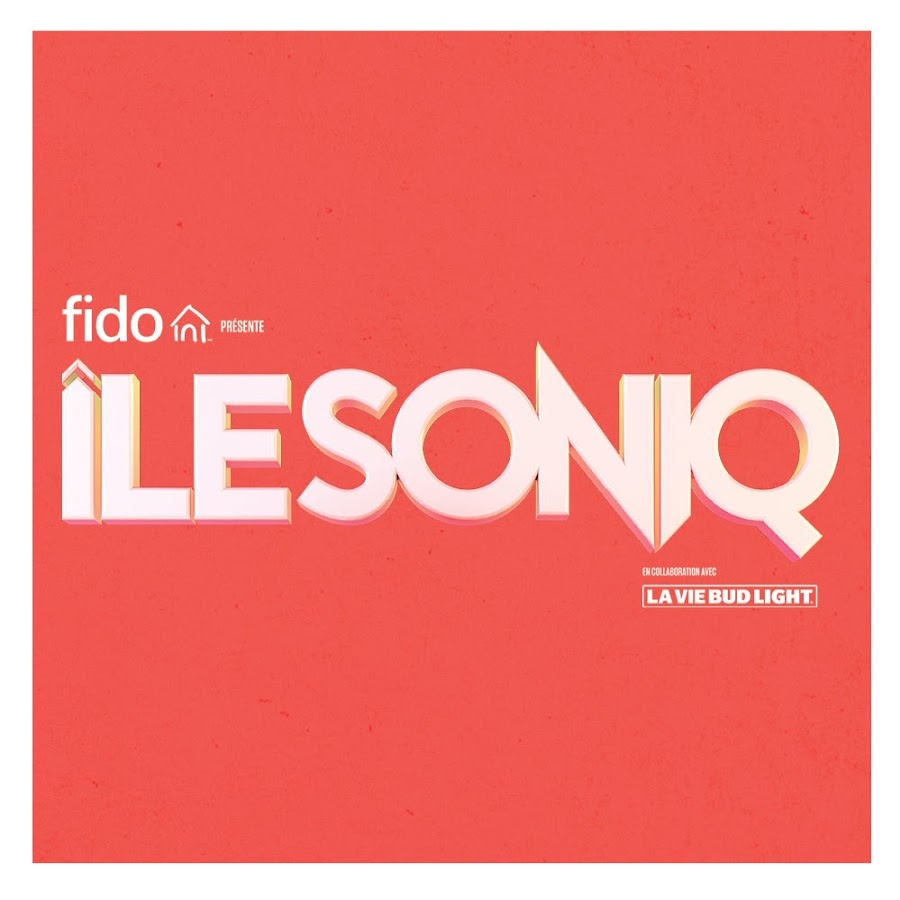
- Genre: Electronic dance music
- Dates: August 8–9 (2026)
- Locations: Parc Jean-Drapeau, Montreal, Quebec, Canada
- Years active: 2014–present
- Attendance: 76,000 (2025, 2 days total)
- Capacity: 45,000 (all stages combined)
- Website: Official website

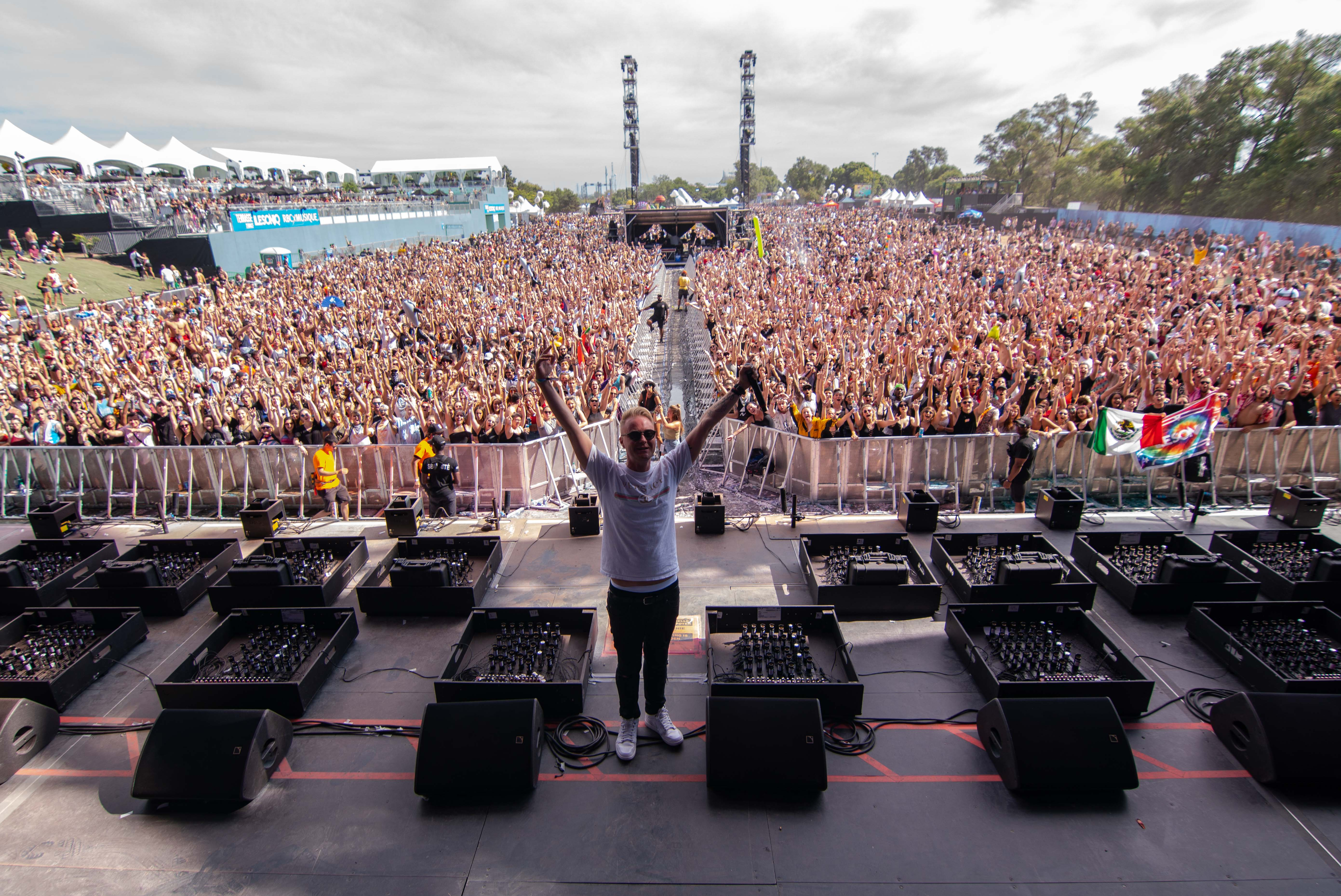
BYNON at ÎleSoniq in 2018

ÎleSoniq Music Festival (French: Festival de musique ÎleSoniq) is a 2-day annual electronic dance music festival held in Montreal, Quebec. It is held every summer at Parc Jean-Drapeau on Île Sainte-Hélène across three different stages. ÎleSoniq became Canada's biggest electronic dance music festival after surpassing the VELD Music Festival's 42,000-capacity in 2025.

== History ==
Created in 2014, ÎleSoniq is located into the heart of Montreal, at Espace 67 of Parc Jean-Drapeau. For three days, the festival has welcomed some of the world's most successful EDM and urban music artists, including ILLENIUM, Swedish House Mafia, Skrillex, The Chainsmokers, Alesso, Adventure Club, Deadmau5, Above & Beyond, and MIGOS. Growing from 25,000 attendees in its first year in 2014, the 2019 edition marked a record of 78,000 people over two days, which is 13,000 more people than the previous year.

After two years of cancellation due to the COVID-19 pandemic, the festival came back in 2022 with a 3-day edition from August 5–7, attracting 85,000 people in total.

The 2024 edition of the ÎleSoniq festival featured duo performances and sets between Nghtmre and Jauz, Green Velvet and Patrick Topping, Odd Mob and Omnom's "Hyperbeam" project, Boogie T and Dirt Monkey, and other well-known artists.

2025 featured the artists John Summit and Illenium as headliners. Roughly 76,000 people attended the festival's 10th edition, including 43,000 on Saturday, which is a single-day attendance record in history, and also making it as the biggest EDM festival in the country. Of the 76,000 concert-goers, approximately 30% of them were not from the province of Quebec.

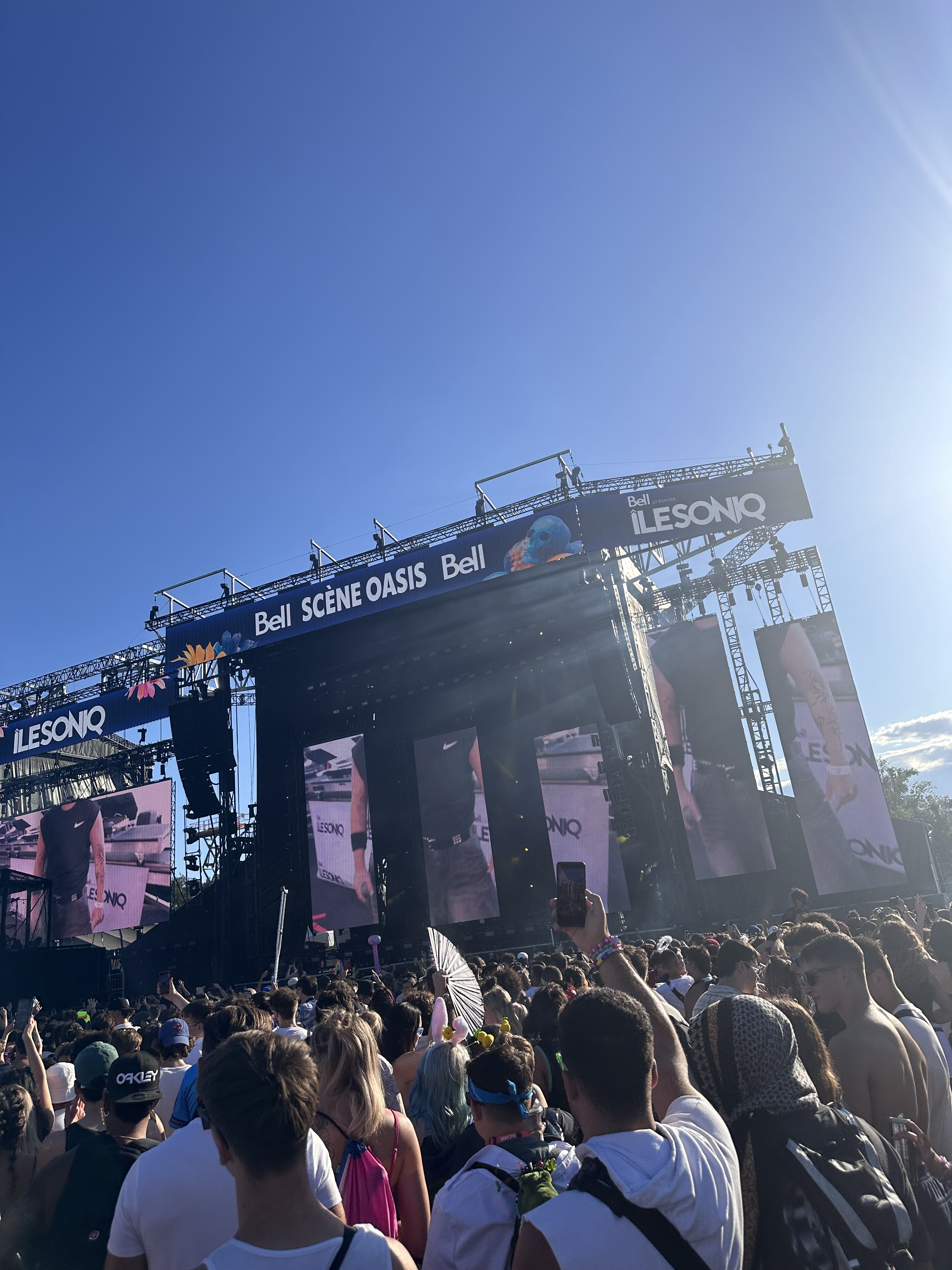
The main OASIS Stage

== Stages ==
- OASIS Stage (30,000 capacity)
- MIRAGE Stage (10,000 capacity)
- NEON Stage (5,000 capacity)

== See also ==
- Osheaga Festival, annual music festival at Parc Jean-Drapeau
- Piknic Électronik, weekly electronic music festival at Parc Jean-Drapeau during summer
