= Voice of Fire =

1967 abstract painting by Barnett Newman

- Artist: Barnett Newman
- Year: 1967
- Type: Acrylic on canvas
- Dimensions: 540 cm × 240 cm (213 in × 94 in)
- Location: National Gallery of Canada; Ottawa

Voice of Fire is a 1967 acrylic on canvas abstract painting made by the American painter Barnett Newman in 1967. It consists of three equally sized vertical stripes, with the outer two painted blue and the centre painted red. The work was created as a special commission for Expo 67. In 1987 it was loaned to the National Gallery of Canada in Ottawa, Ontario, Canada.

The purchase of Voice of Fire by the National Gallery of Canada for its permanent collection in 1989 at a cost of $1.8 million caused controversy. Some residents mocked the purchase with striped T-shirts and ties that mimicked the painting. The 1996 book Voices of Fire: Art Rage, Power, and the State, edited by Bruce Barber, Serge Guilbaut and John O'Brian, discusses the issues around the purchase of the painting.

== History of Voice of Fire ==
Commissioned for Expo 67, the International and Universal Exposition that took place in Montreal during Canada's 1967 centennial, Voice of Fire was part of the U.S. pavilion organized by art critic and historian Alan Solomon. The exhibition, American Painting Now featured the work of twenty-two artists installed in the U.S. Pavilion, a geodesic dome designed by engineer Buckminster Fuller (now the Montreal Biosphere). Explicitly oriented to Solomon's directions, Voice of Fire's 18 foot length was vertical to echo the size of the dome. This was the first time Newman worked on this scale in a vertical format. The paintings were displayed along other symbols of American progress, an Apollo space capsule and red-and-white striped Apollo parachutes, photographs of the Moon, and large-scale photographs of movie stars.

In the spring of 1987, Brydon Smith, then assistant director of the National Gallery of Canada contacted Newman's widow Annalee to ask if she would consider lending it to the gallery for a temporary exhibition the following year to coincide with the completion of a new building.

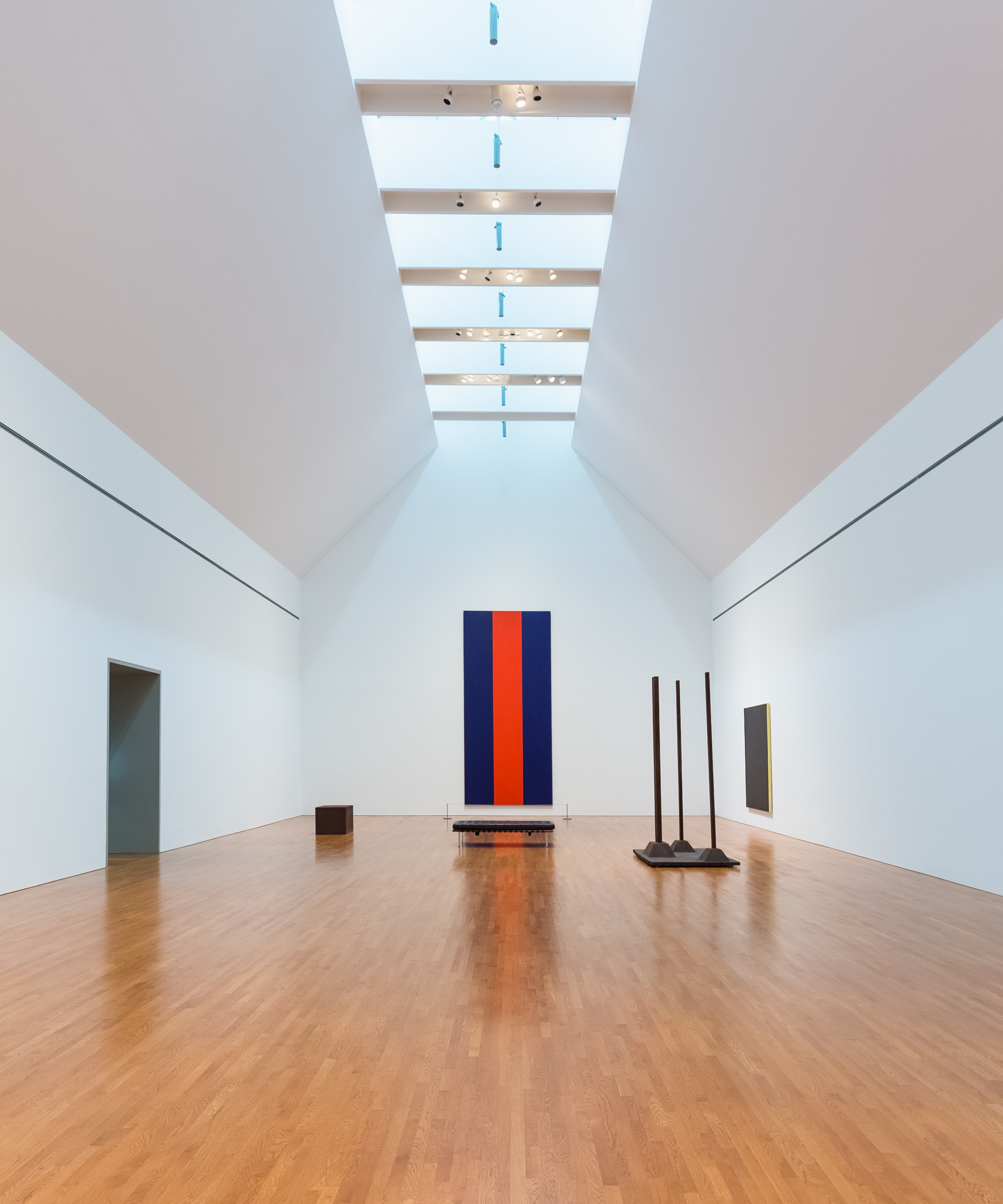
Voice Of Fire, National Art Gallery, 2015

In May 1988 Voice of Fire was installed in the newly constructed National Gallery of Canada with little media attention or controversy. It was displayed in a large, high-ceiling space, with only a few other works by American artists Milton Resnick, Jackson Pollock and Tony Smith. In this display of post-war US art, Voice of Fire "was given pride of place" as the centrepiece. In March 1990, the National Gallery announced its purchase of the painting for $1.8 million, which ignited a "firestorm" of media attention and controversy in Ottawa mostly centred on the question of whether the work was worthy of being called art. In 2014, it was reported that senior personnel at the National Gallery estimated that the current value of the painting is in excess of $40 million. The work remains in the possession of the National Gallery of Canada.

== Sources ==
- O'Brian, John. "Who's Afraid of Barnett Newman?" Voices of Fire: Art Rage, Power, and the State. Bruce Barber, Serge Guilbaut and John O'Brian, eds. Toronto: University of Toronto Press, 1996. ISBN 0-8020-7803-6
- Smith, Brydon. "Some Thoughts about the Making and Meaning of Voice of Fire." Voices of Fire: Art Rage, Power, and the State. Bruce Barber, Serge Guilbaut and John O'Brian, eds. Toronto: University of Toronto Press, 1996. ISBN 0-8020-7803-6
