= Micheline Legendre =

Canadian puppeteer

Micheline Legendre OC CQ
- Legendre in 1977
- Born: 18 February 1923; Outremont, Quebec
- Died: 5 January 2010 (aged 86); Outremont, Quebec
- Citizenship: Canada
- Education: École de musique Vincent-d'Indy; Université de Montréal
- Occupations: Violinist; Puppeteer; Art historian
- Years active: 1945–2010
- Organization: Les marionettes de Montréal

Micheline Legendre OC CQ (18 February 1923 – 5 January 2010) was a Canadian puppeteer. She performed on television and on stage with her troupe, Les marionnettes de Montréal. Her oeuvre spanned 1,170 puppets created and more than 16,000 performances for 2.5 million audience members. Legendre was a violinist by training and her marionnette troupe played with the Montreal Symphony Orchestra and the New York Philharmonic, for Radio-Canada and the National Film Board of Canada, among others. She was also an art historian at the Université de Montréal.

== Early life ==
Micheline Legendre was born in Outremont, Quebec, on 18 February 1923, to Jean-Charles Legendre and Yvonne Lafontaine. She grew up with one sister, Raymonde. Legendre attended Collège Jésus-Marie, then the Collège Basile-Moreau. She began university studies at the École de musique Vincent d'Indy, where she studied to be a violinist, planning a career in music. From 1942 to 1945 she trained with violinist Maurice Onderet, who was a soloist in the chamber orchestra in which Legendre was also a member, the Petite symphonie de Montréal.

== Puppetry career ==
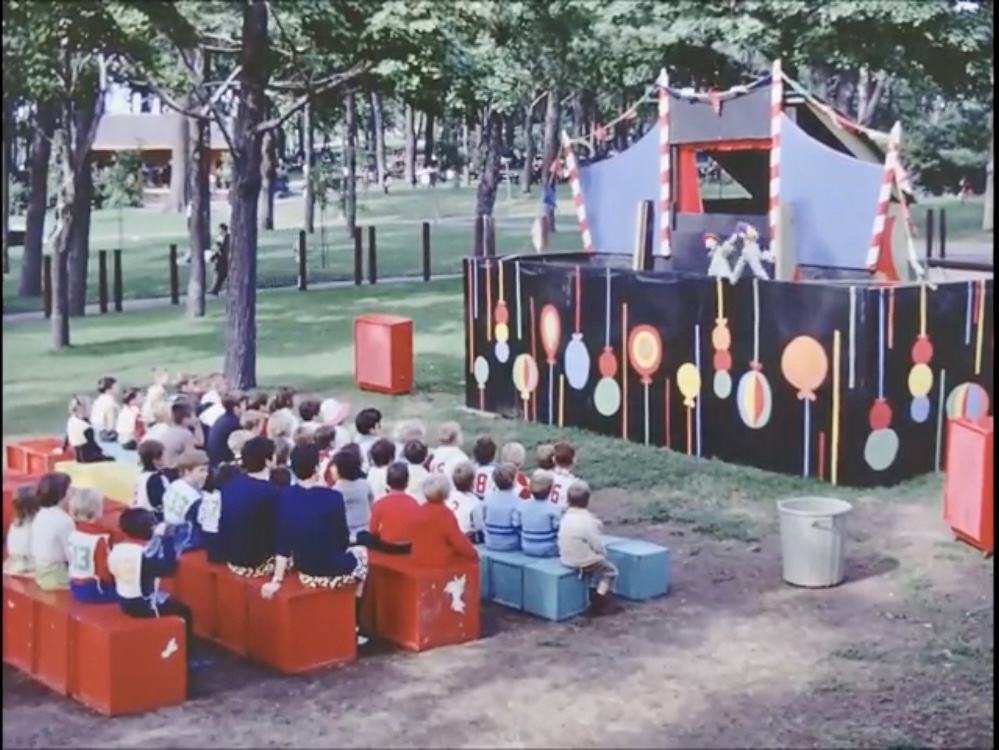
A puppet show at Expo 67 in Montreal

In 1945, the Petite symphonie introduced Legendre to German puppeteer (and former prisoner of war) Albert Wolff, who came to perform Canada's first professional puppet show. Legendre was one of the members of the chamber orchestra enlisted as his puppeteers for the marionette production to accompany Bastien and Bastienne, part of a Mozart festival the group was holding for its tenth anniversary. This offered a new path for Legendre's music career and she undertook to study puppeteering with Wolff, as well as with Sue Hastings in New York. Legendre later went to France to work with Jacques Chesnais. Her study with Chesnais and his Comédiens en bois (Wooden actors) was part of a European tour of apprenticeships she undertook beginning in late 1951; she said later of the puppet master's training in technique, "I owe him everything."

Legendre had founded her troupe Les marionnettes de Montréal in 1948, when Wolff left Canada for South America and gave her his equipment. Their first show, in May 1948, adapted a folk song: Le plus rusé des hommes... c'est sa femme. But success was not immediate and when Legendre returned from Europe, she resumed her formal education at the Université de Montréal, at the Institute for Medieval Studies, where she became an assistant professor of art history.

At the same time she continued pursuing puppetry and began collaborating with orchestras including the Montreal Symphony Orchestra (MSO) and the New York Philharmonic. Working with conductor Wilfrid Pelletier, she set marionette pieces to a series of symphonies, beginning with Debussy's La boîte à joujoux, which premiered with the Philharmonic in 1955 and later presented with the MSO as well as the Toronto Symphony Orchestra. Other pieces in this series included Prokofiev's Peter and the Wolf in 1956 and Stravinsky's Petrushka in 1958.

In 1964, Legendre launched a marionnette production of The Adventures of Tintin, to which she had acquired exclusive rights. The show ran for seven summers in the Jardin des Merveilles in Montreal's La Fontaine Park.

She became an advocate for the development of the art of puppetry in Canada, arguing for a new style in the "present tense" that would take knowledge of traditional puppetry techniques and apply it to current events. In 1969 she introduced the first course in puppetry at the Université de Montréal, training students that went on to work for marionnettes troupes L'Illusion and the Théâtre de l'Oeil. In 1967 she organized Canada's first puppetry festival as part of the Youth Pavilion of the 1967 World Exposition in Montreal. It ran for a week and brought eight companies to perform, including Chesnais's Wooden Actors, Ina Von Macaho's marionnettes, Albert Roser, the Czech Marion Theater from Spejbl and Hurvink, as well as Austrian and Polish companies. Legendre's company performed an adaptation of Hans Christian Andersen's fairy tale "The Nightingale".

Among her best-known works was a 1984 television adaptation of Marguerite Yourcenar's Comment Wang-Fô fut sauvé, directed by Guy Leduc. It was part of a series of films she made with the National Film Board of Canada. She also frequently performed on Radio-Canada, working on more than 400 television shows. In total, she created more than 1,170 puppets and gave more than 16,000 performances, to a collective audience of 2.5 million. In 1986, she published Marionnettes: art et tradition, an overview of the world history of puppetry as well as a detailed account of her own troupe, illustrated with many photographs of her collection of puppets.

== Public life ==
In 1960, Legendre visited China as part of a Canadian delegation that included Pierre Trudeau (later prime minister) and Jacques Hébert. With Trudeau, she also cofounded the journal Cité libre. In 1978 and 1979 she was chair of the Canadian Conference of the Arts and also served on the board of the Montreal Council for the Arts for several years.

== Honours ==
Legendre was named a Knight of the National Order of Quebec in 1991. The citation noted that "[h]er immense collection of marionnettes constitutes a major contribution to the history of Quebecois theater and international theater in Quebec." She was named an officer of the Order of Canada in 1998, and became a member of the Royal Society of Canada in 2001. UNIMA, the International Puppetry Union, made her an honorary member at its congress in Germany in 2000.

== Personal life ==
Legendre died in her home in Outremont, Quebec, on 5 January 2010.

== Publications ==
- Legendre, Micheline (1958). "Marionnette". Vie des Arts (in French) (13): 10–18. ISSN 0042-5435.
- Legendre, Micheline (1960). "L'éducation en Chine". Liberté (in French). 2 (6): 350–353. ISSN 0024-2020.
- Legendre, Micheline (1961). "L'éducation en Chine, seconde partie". Liberté (in French). 3 (1): 425–429. ISSN 0024-2020.
- Legendre, Micheline (1961). "Review of Deux innocents en Chine rouge". Liberté (in French). 3 (3–4): 660–662. ISSN 0024-2020.
- Legendre, Micheline (1986). Marionnettes: art et tradition (in French). Leméac. ISBN 2-7609-8826-0. OCLC 465733529.
