= Expo Express =

Former rapid transit system in Montreal, Quebec

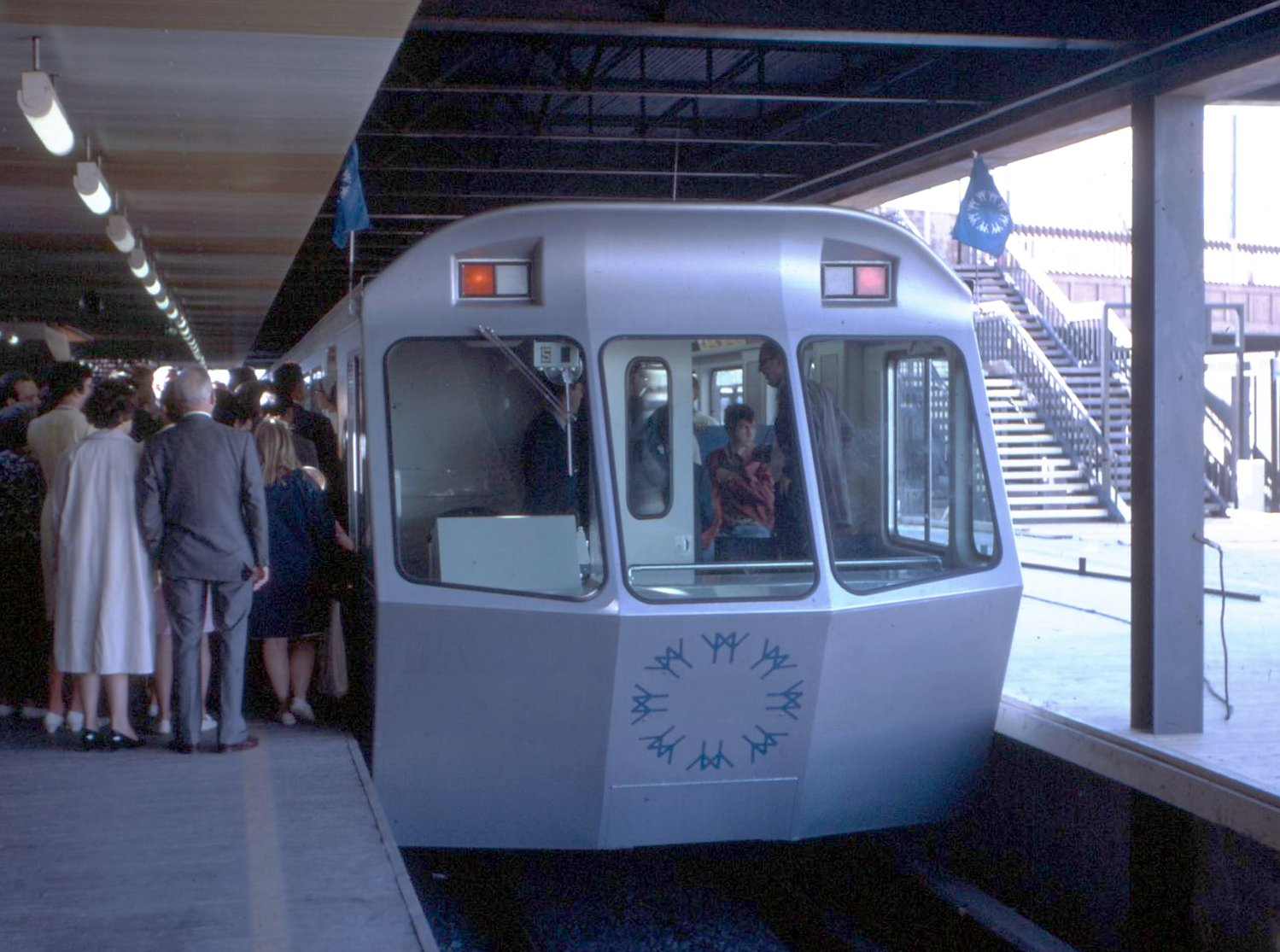
- Front view of Expo Express train at Place d'Accueil terminal in Cite du Havre

Overview
- Status: Demolished
- Owner: Expo 67; City of Montreal (1968)
- Locale: Montreal, Quebec, Canada
- Termini: Place d’Accueil; La Ronde
- Stations: 5

Service
- Type: Rapid Transit
- Rolling stock: Hawker Siddeley H1 variant; 8 × 6-car sets

History
- Opened: April 1967
- Closed: October 1973

Technical
- Line length: 5.7 km (3.5 mi)
- Track gauge: 4 ft 8 1/2 in (1,435 mm) standard gauge
- Electrification: Third rail 600 V DC

The Expo Express was a rapid transit system consisting of five stations and a 5.7-kilometre (3.5 mi) route, running from Cité du Havre to La Ronde in Montreal, Quebec, Canada. Built for the 1967 world's fair, Expo 67, at a cost of approximately CA$18 million, the trains carried 1,000 passengers each and ran approximately every five minutes.

In 1968, the cars were sold to the City of Montreal for $1.8 million and operated by the Montreal Transit Commission. The train remained in limited service for Man and His World for six additional years; it ran, however, on a shortened route from 1969 onwards, when tracks were cut back to Saint Helen's Island. Service ended in 1973.

== Vehicles ==
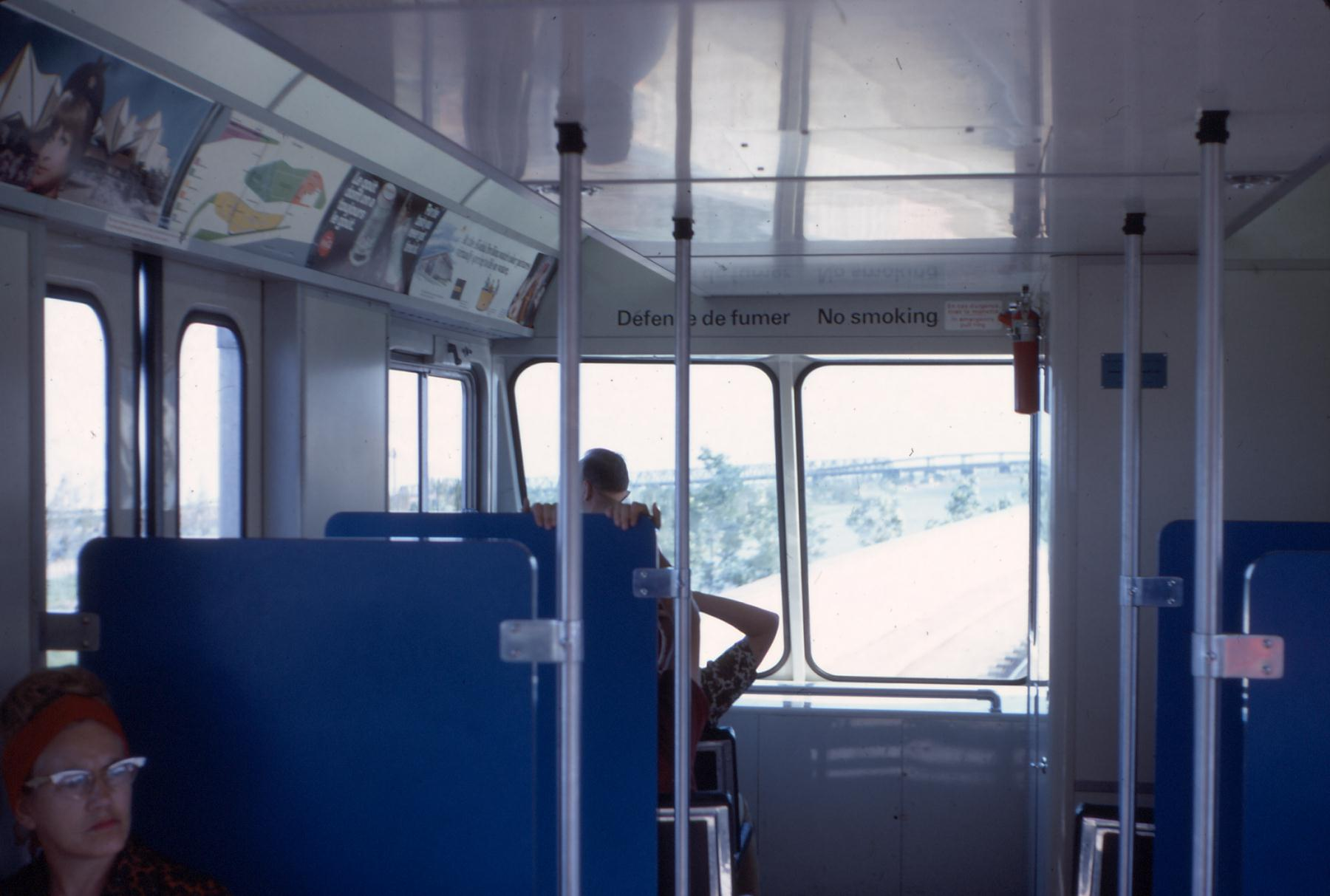
Interior of Expo Express train looking toward front

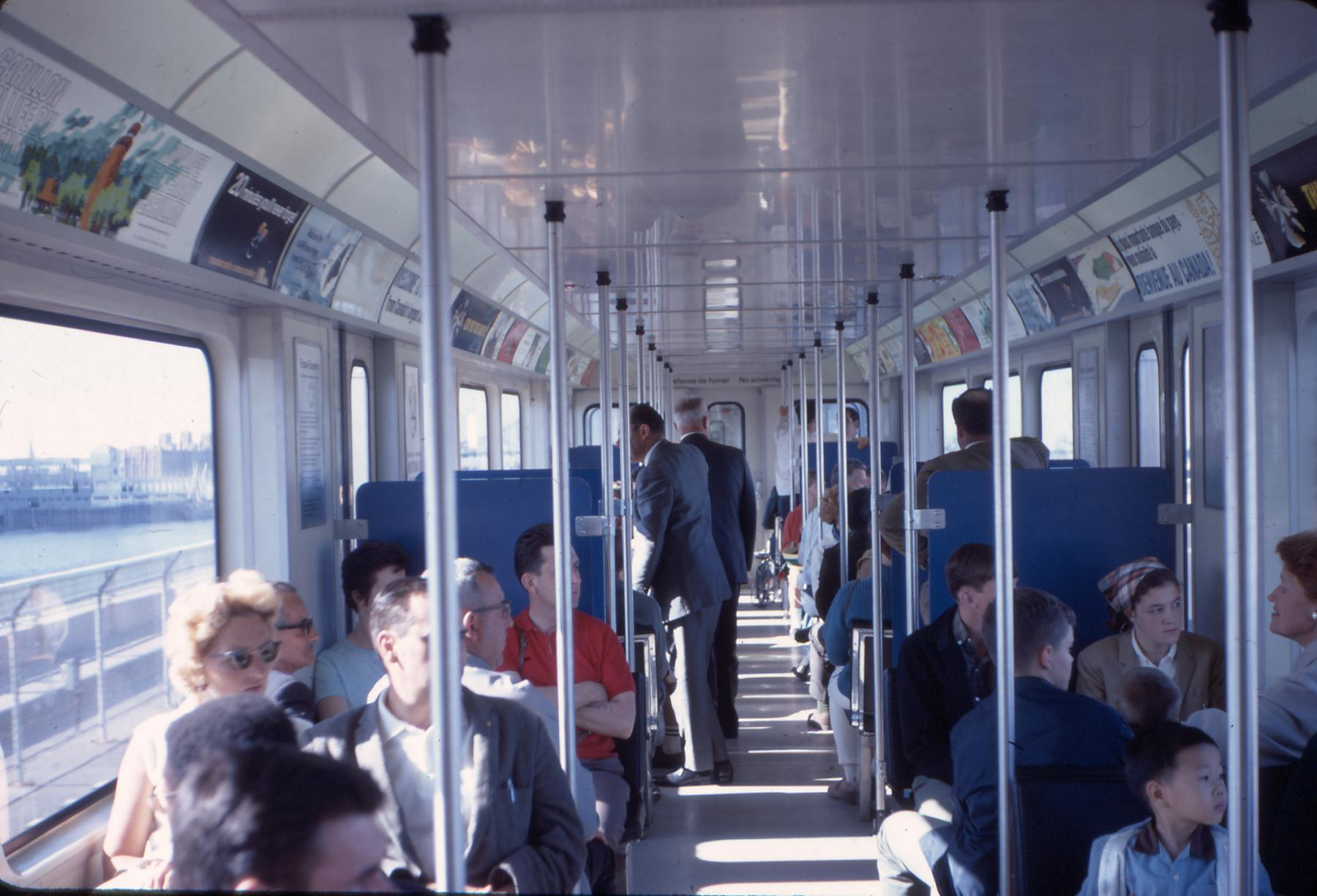
Interior of Expo Express train looking toward rear of car

Not to be confused with the Minirail monorail which ran within the perimeters of the Expo Site, the Expo Express used standard railway technology, with two running rails and a third electrified rail identical to those of the Toronto subway. The trains used were a modified version of the Hawker Siddeley H series used by the Toronto Transit Commission with one fewer door on each side, three instead of four and streamlined ends. Unlike the Montreal Metro, the Expo Express used traditional steel-wheeled trains with fully air-conditioned passenger cars.

The fleet of rolling stock consisted of 48 cars in total, with the name of a sponsoring Canadian city or local municipality inscribed in large lettering on both sides of each car (e.g. "Richmond, BC", "Town of Mount Royal", "Point Claire, Quebec", "Cornwall, Ontario"). The 16 streamlined end cars all had motor-generator (MG) sets but no air compressors; 8 of them also had ATO equipment. Of the 32 intermediate cars, 24 had compressors and eight had MG sets. Typical consists were: one end car with ATO equipment; three intermediate cars with compressors; one intermediate car with MG; and one end car without ATO equipment.

== Background ==
The Expo Express was the first fully-automated rapid transit system in North America, utilizing an automatic train operation (ATO) system based on audio frequency track circuits furnished by the Union Switch & Signal division of Westinghouse Air Brake Company. This fact, however, was not widely publicized during the fair, as it was felt the public would not readily board a train controlled entirely by a computer. Operators from Montreal's transit union were placed in cabs at the front and given mundane tasks such as opening and closing the doors of the train to reduce boredom.

This resulted in a minor incident during the fair at La Ronde station. The conductor had pressed the button to close the doors and proceed, but his train had already sensed an oncoming express from Notre Dame Island and automatically delayed the go command to let it roll in. In the meantime, the driver realized he had forgotten his lunch. However, he could not exit through the passenger doors because his train was in a "wait" state and would not allow the doors to open. Instead, he crawled through the small cab window. By the time he had fetched his lunch, however, the oncoming train had pulled in and his train had taken off on its own. It crossed the bridge over the Le Moyne Channel, proceeded along the seaway, and came to a smooth stop at Notre Dame Island station where an Expo official was waiting. This person crawled back through the cab window and pressed the button to open the doors and let the passengers disembark.

== Route ==
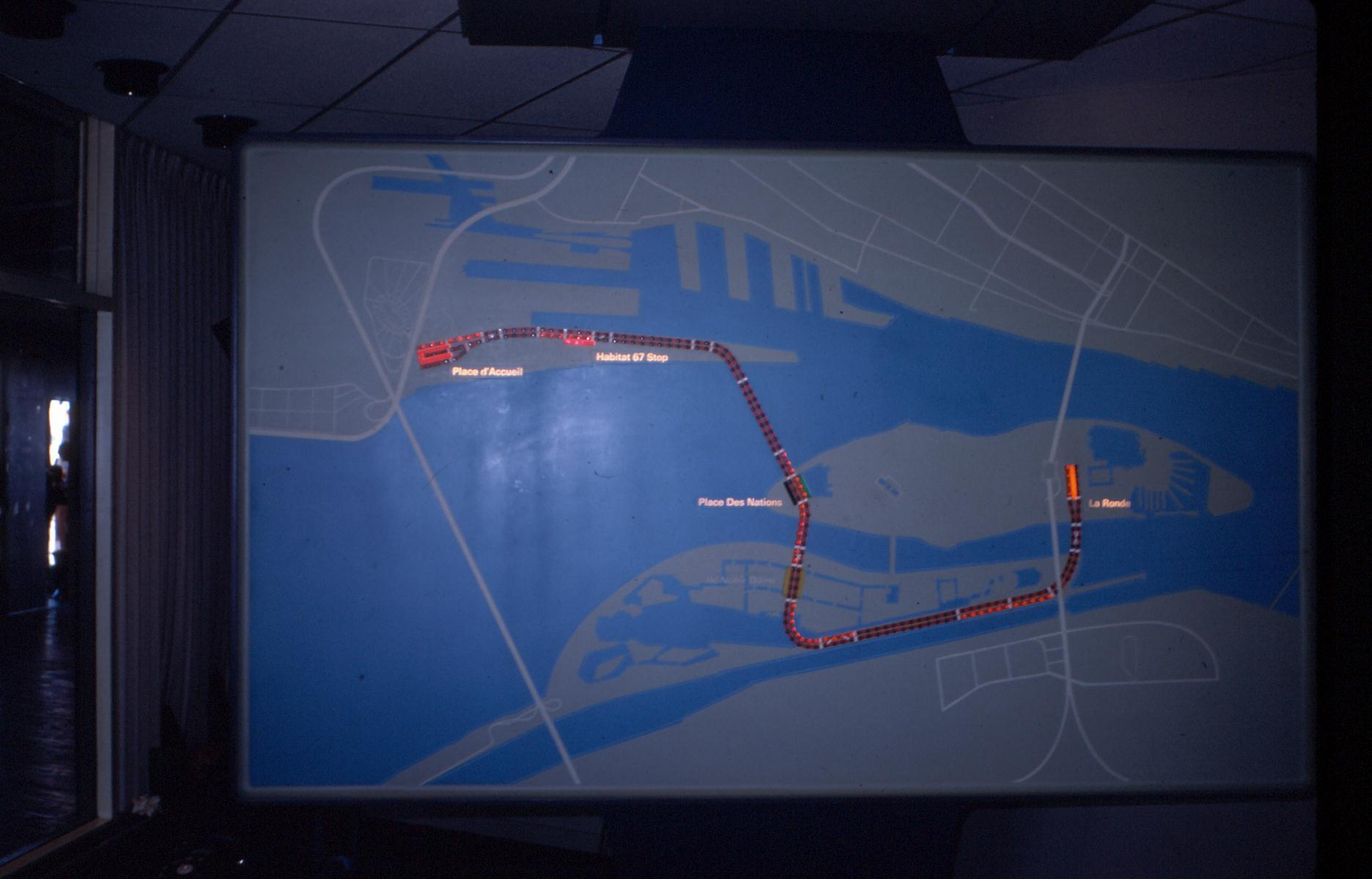
Model board at Expo Express control centre at Place d' Accueil terminal showing line layout

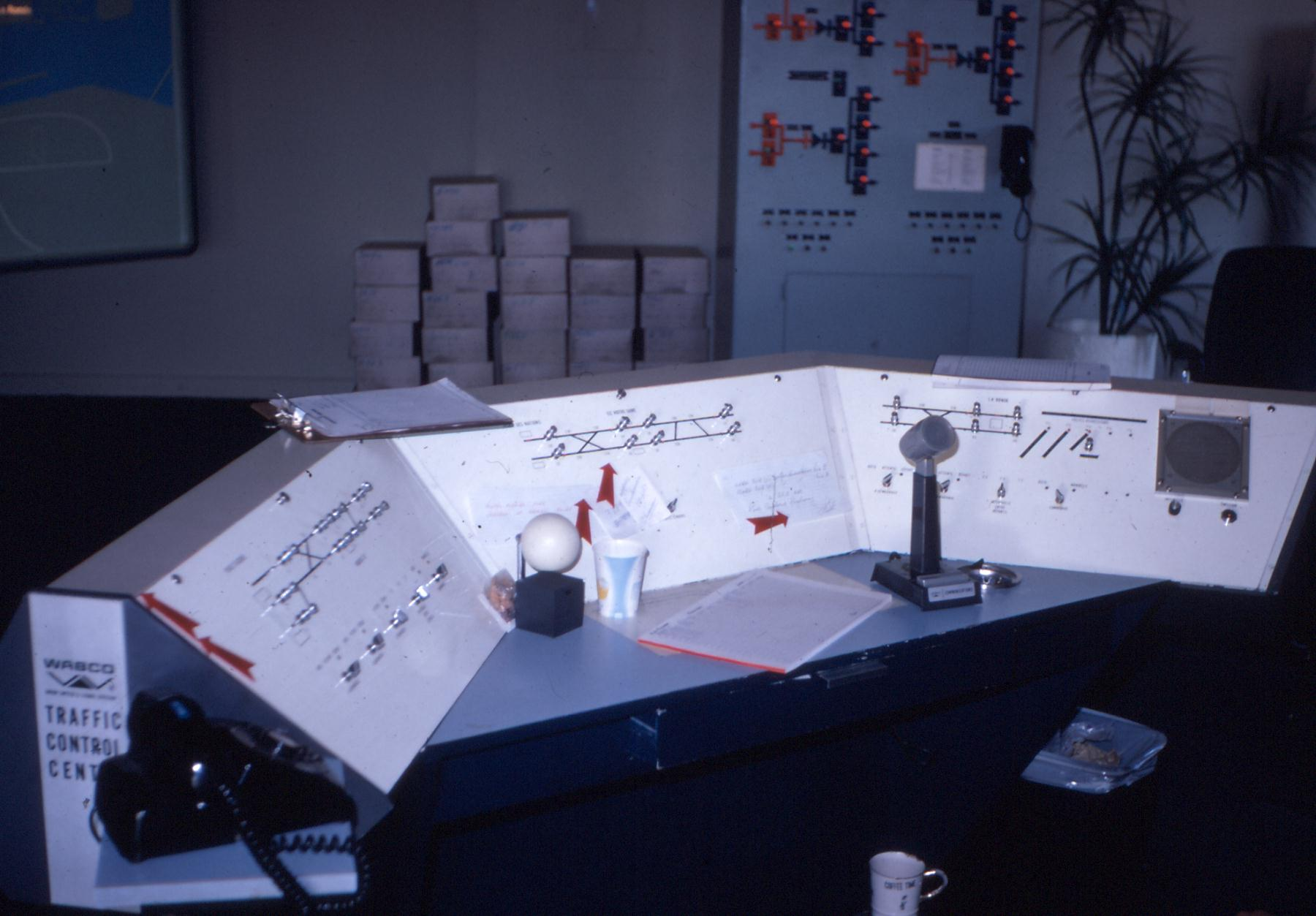
Control console at Expo Express control centre at Place d' Accueil terminal

The route had 5 stations: Place d'accueil, Habitat '67, Place des Nations, Ile Notre-Dame and La Ronde.

The line started at the southern end of Cite du Havre, with the Place d'accueil station adjacent to the Bonadventure Expressway. It headed north, where a half-mile down was the Habitat '67 station (eliminated early on, due to low use) after which it turned east and crossed over the Saint Lawrence river by means of the Concordia Bridge. The next stop was on Saint Helen's island, with the Place des Nations station situated on the Concordia bridge, between Places Des Nation and Swan Lake. It was followed by a crossing over the Moyne Channel to Notre-Dame Island, with the Ile Notre-Dame station further up on the Pont des Iles bridge, next to the Man the Producer pavilion. From there, the line turned north and traveled alongside the Saint Lawrence seaway until crossing the Moyne Channel again, via a westwards train bridge to La Ronde station–the terminus at the fairground entrance.

The line was double-track throughout, except for a single-track section at Cité du Havre, where people exited on one side of the train and boarded on the other. Shortly after Expo opened, due to unexpected visitor congestion, the Cité du Havre line was changed to double-track to accelerate passenger movement. All the Maintenance facilities were located northwest of La Ronde station: past that point service tracks extended to the Expo Express' maintenance yard and its rolling stock storage tracks.

In 1969, the Cite du Havre line was permanently closed and the starting point was cut back to Place des Nations on Saint Helen's Island (initially single-tracked). That same year the Habitat '67 station (closed in early 1967) was physically relocated to Notre Dame Island, near the Man and Agriculture pavilion, and renamed Notre-Dame East station. The Habitat '67 station (outbound only), and its eventual replacement, the Notre-Dame East station (inbound only), only allowed for bordering trains in one direction.

In 1972, all stations on Notre Dame Island closed, making the route direct from Place des Nations to La Ronde station with no stops in between.

== History ==
The Expo Express ran from April 1967 to October 1973. After Expo, when service continued during the early days of Man and his World, the express only ran for two months during the summer each year.

In 1968, the New York City Transit Authority looked into the feasibility of modifying the cars for use on the Staten Island Railway, but this plan never came to fruition. That same year, the Societe des Transports Rapides Incorporated made a bid to modify the cars for a monorail system running from Laval to Montreal, but that plan also fell through. In the end, the Montreal Transit Commission purchased the cars for $1.8 million and took over operation of the train–simply renamed The Express, and kept its rolling stock, route and stations unmodified throughout 1968.

In 1969, service at Cite du Harve was ceased, and the line south-west of St. Helen's Island was demolished along with its two stations. That same year St.Helen's Island became the new starting point for the train and the Notre-Dame East station opened.

In 1972, both stations on Notre-Dame Island closed (Notre Dame Island was inaccessible to the public that year onward), making it a non-stop ride to La Ronde. In 1973, the Express saw its final year of operations. At season's end, the trains were moved and put in storage on Pont des Iles bridge, between Saint Helen's and Notre Dame Islands. In 1974, the line north of Notre-Dame Island was demolished for the construction of the Olympic basin, leaving the trains stranded on the bridge with the line now cut in both directions.

In 1979, the trains were sold to a Montreal business man for $380,000 and that summer the trains were moved again, to the Port of Montreal via a temporary track, and stored at the Canadian National's nearby Point Saint Charles workshops.

In 1984, unable to resale the trains, and concerns about returns on the investment, they were sold to Pemik Enterprises and the cars were moved from Point St-Charles to an outdoor field storage facility in Les Cèdres. In 1988, after four years of failed plans, including a reported sale to the New Jersey Sports and Exposition Authority, Pemik proposed the Government of Quebec renovate the cars and use them for a new commuter train route between St Hilaire and Montreal, with Bombardier interested in renovating the cars, but this too failed.

In 1995, after several unrealized schemes and the deteriorated state of the rolling stock, the cars were scrapped.

Virtually nothing remains of the Expo Express today. The only evidence is at La Ronde, where a train bridge deteriorates in the river and remnants of the La Ronde station have been converted into the main park entrance. The area where Place d'Accueil stood is now a parking lot, and part of the track route is a paved bicycle path.
