= Minirail =

Defunct automated monorail system

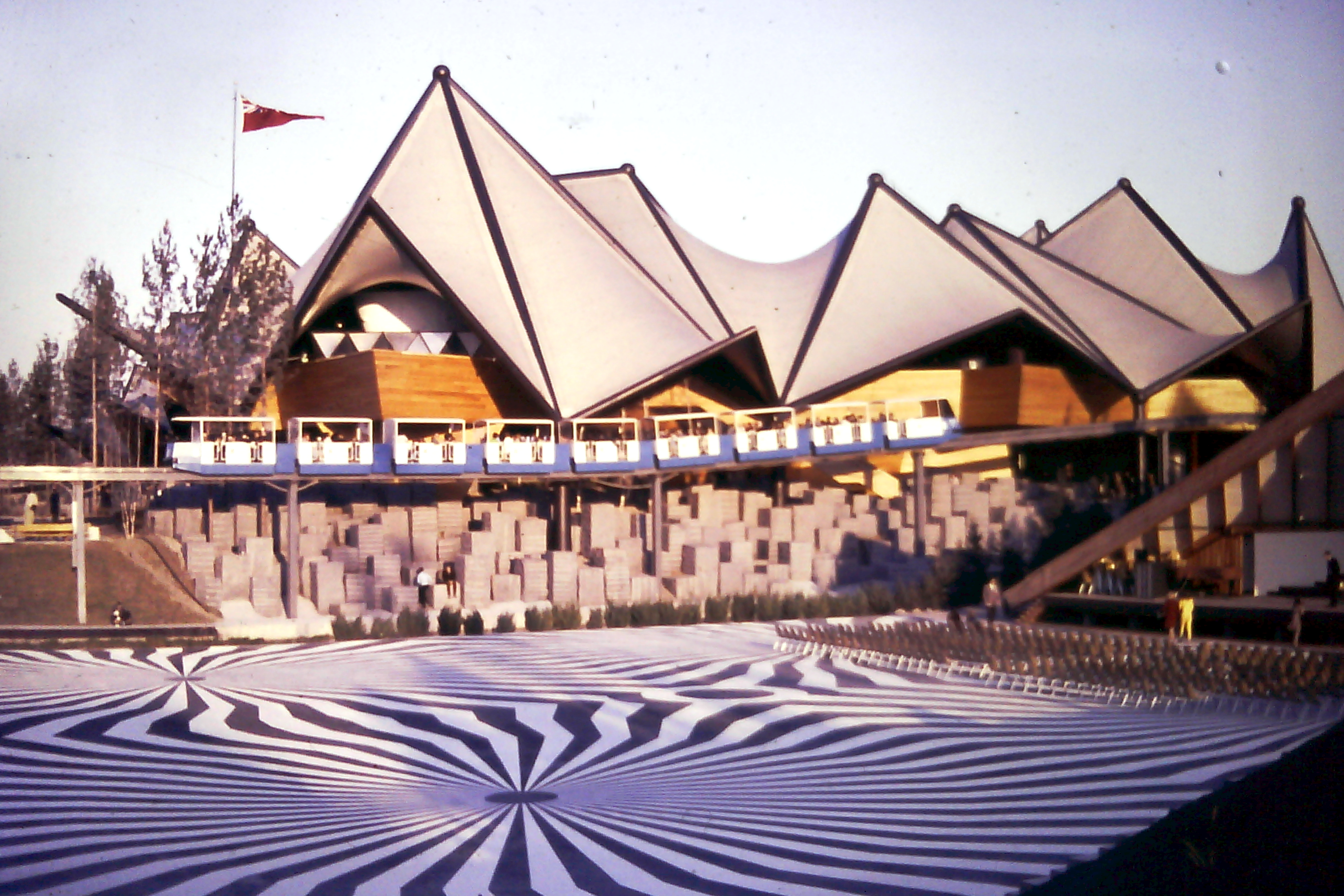
The minirail passing the Ontario pavilion.

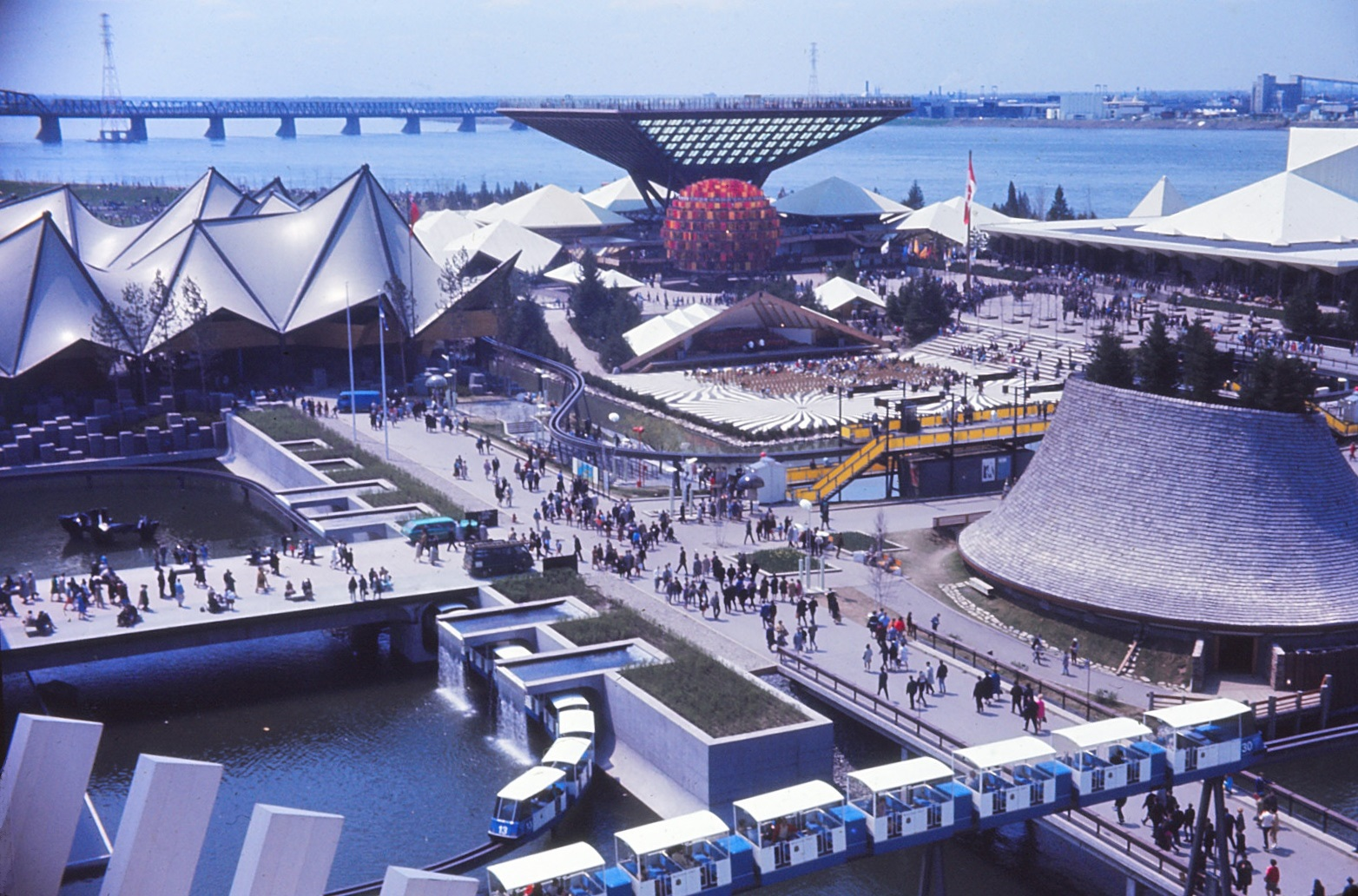
The Minirail snaking past the Ontario (left), Canada (centre) and Western Provinces pavilions (right).

The Minirail was an automated monorail system on Saint Helen's and Notre Dame islands in Montreal, Quebec, Canada. The network was built for the 1967 World's Fair (Expo 67), and continued to operate for Man and his World. The system consisted of three independent circuits operated by two different types of trains: the larger "Blue" that ran mostly on Notre Dame Island, and the smaller "Yellow" which ran on the north and south ends Saint Helen's Island.

The main circuits of the Minirail ceased service in the early 70's and 80's then demolished shortly after, however the La Ronde "Yellow" loop, segregated from the rest of the system on the north end, remained in service for over a half century. This last vestige of the Minirail ended service in 2019 and was demolished in 2022.

== Routes ==
The main part of the system was the "Blue" Minirail on Notre Dame Island (with a small cross over loop on its neighboring island). There were also two smaller loops: the "Yellow" Minirails on opposite ends of Saint Helen's Island. The minimum system radius was 15 metres (50 ft), and maximum grade 10%.

=== Notre Dame Island (Blue) ===
(1967-1973) The larger Minirail was laid out to pass as many major points as possible. Stations were named for nearby major attractions. The 6.8-kilometre (4.2 mi) circuit had six stops at four stations: Metro, Canada, Theme and Agriculture (the latter two stations being served twice). Although on an elevated structure up to 12 metres (40 ft) above the ground for most of its length, the line also swung out over the water near the Quebec Pavilion, dropping to within 1.8 metres (6 ft) of the St. Lawrence. It also ran through the Ontario pavilion and the geodesic dome of the U.S. Pavilion. A section of the Blue line crossed over and ran a small loop on Saint Helen's Island, primarily to connect to the Metro and (south) Yellow Minirail line. The track structure was designed by the Swiss firm of Maschinenfabrik Habegger and fabricated on-site by Dominion Bridge Company. The running rails were twin 533-millimetre (21 in) × 8 1/4-inch (210 mm) "I" beams 552 millimetres (21 3/4 in) apart, supported on A-frame pylons on 15-metre (50 ft) centres, reduced to 10 metres (34 ft) on curves. The Blue Minirail continued to operate on Notre Dame Island until late 1973, despite the closure and abandonment of the park below two years earlier. During these final two years there were no stops as all stations on Notre Dame Island were closed, therefore passengers boarded and exited at the Metro Minirail station on Saint Helen's Island. Service ceased by the end of the 1973 season. The circuit itself was dismantled by the mid-1970s, primarily due to construction of the Olympic rowing basin.

=== Saint Helen's Island (Yellow) ===
(1967-1981) The Saint Helen's Island Yellow Minirail ran around a 1.8-kilometre (1.1 mi) loop on the south end of the island with two stations: Metro and Place des nation (that connected with the Metro, Blue Minirail, and the Expo Express). After leaving the latter station the route swung over a corner of Swan Lake. It ceased operation when the Saint Helen's Island section of Man and His World closed in late 1981, and then later demolished in the mid-1980s.

=== La Ronde (Yellow) ===
(1967-2019) The La Ronde Yellow Minirail was also on Saint Helen's Island, at its north end, but was completely separate from the rest of the system. It circled the amusement park, and its 1.3-mile (2.1 km) route also passed the Marina and ran in between Dolphin Lake and the Saint Lawrence River. It had two stations: Fort Edmonton (nee Pioneerland) and Village. In the mid 80's the track loop behind the Alcan aquarium was removed for construction of the Aqua park, making for a slightly shortened route. Service finally ceased in 2019, after 52 years in service. In November 2022, the park demolished the ride, the longest serving and final vestige of the Expo 67 Minirail.

== Equipment ==
=== Blue ===
The Blue Minirail received its nickname from the color of the cars' body, accented with white roof and doors. Passengers rode in open cars that carried a maximum of 12 people in each. Nine cars made up a single train; one head car, seating only three passengers, seven mid-section cars and one tail car.

=== Yellow ===
The Yellow Minirails received their nicknames from the colour of the cars' canopies. Twelve 16-car trains operated on each line. Each train seated 60 in its 32-metre (105 ft) length. Also designed by Habegger, these cars were built in 1964 for the Swiss National Exhibition held that year in Lausanne. Originally controlled by an on-board operator, they were converted to automatic operation for Expo 67. Additional cars were purchased from the manufacturer, Von Roll Seilbahnen AG. to replace the rolling stock and rail from Lausanne that were sold to Blackpool's Pleasure Beach. The Yellow Minirails ran on a pair of outward-facing 89-millimetre (3 1/2 in) × 305-millimetre (12 in) "C" channels, 116 millimetres (4 9/16 in) apart and supported on A-frames. Both Yellow loop routes were built by Mojan Ltée.

When Six Flags Corporation took over management of La Ronde at the turn of the century, the company replaced the minirail's eponymous yellow canopies with aqua-green colored ones. Additionally, snack food advertisements relating to the park were affixed to the sides of each Minirail car.
