= Montreal Biosphere =

Environment museum in Montreal, Quebec

Coordinates: 45°30′50.73″N 73°31′53.38″W

Biosphere
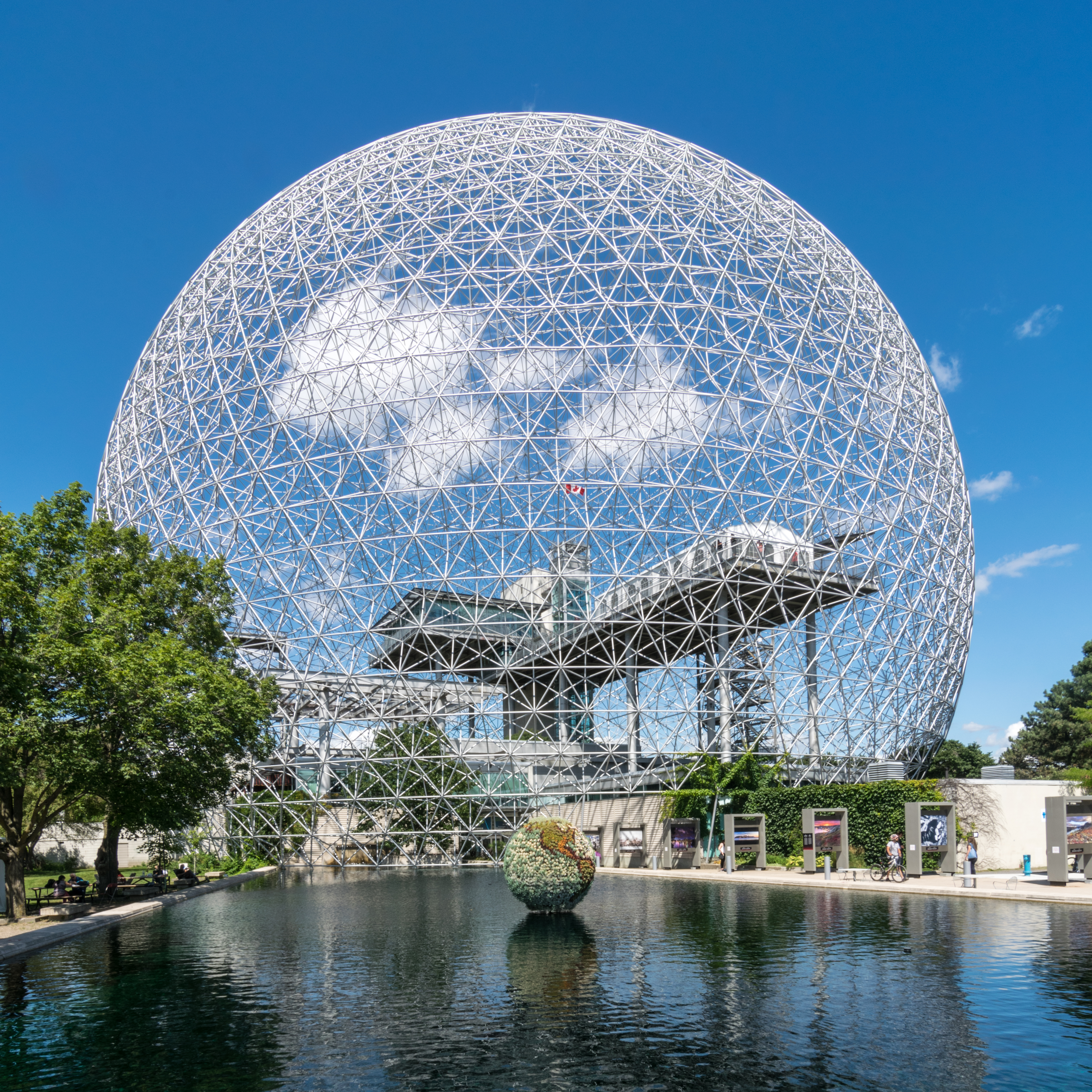
- Established: 1967
- Location: 160 Tour-de-l'Isle road Montreal, Quebec; H3C 4G8
- Type: environment museum
- Owner: Space for Life
- Public transit access: at Jean-Drapeau
- Website: espacepourlavie.ca/en/biosphere

The Biosphere, also known as the Montreal Biosphere (French: Biosphère de Montréal, pronounced [bjɔsfɛʁ də mɔ̃ʁeal]), is a museum dedicated to the environment in Montreal, Quebec, Canada. It is housed in the former United States pavilion constructed for Expo 67 located within the grounds of Parc Jean-Drapeau on Saint Helen's Island. The museum's geodesic dome was designed by Buckminster Fuller.

== History ==
=== Expo 67 ===
The structure was originally built as the United States pavilion at Expo 67. The United States Information Agency, which was responsible for the U.S. presence at the exposition, revealed its plans for the pavilion in June 1965. The geodesic dome exterior was designed by R. Buckminster Fuller with Shoji Sadao and Geometrics Inc., while the interior structures and exhibits were designed by Cambridge Seven Associates. The construction project, led by the George A. Fuller Company, began in December 1965.

Fuller's original proposal had entailed a much larger dome, with a suspended geodesic sphere inside it that would serve as the setting for his "World Game" project. This was to be an interactive world map featuring "information about raw materials, shipping routes, energy consumption, population growth and other geographical and technical facts". Players would "make decisions based upon this data, in the interests of the entire globe, which reciprocally affected the system as it developed". However, Fuller's proposals for the interior were rejected by the organizing committee.

The Expo opened on 27 April 1967 and ran until 29 October 1967. Upon entering the pavilion, visitors ascended a 41-metre (135 ft) escalator, reported to be the longest unsupported escalator in the world, to reach the exhibit platforms. The two uppermost platforms held "Destination: Moon", an exhibit on NASA's space programs; spacecraft were hung from the dome's steel frame, including the Freedom 7, Gemini 7, and Apollo AS-202 capsules. On the mezzanine level, the "American Spirit" exhibit displayed a wide variety of artifacts, including American Indian crafts, folk art objects, guitars owned by famous musicians, a collection of dolls, and an array of almost 300 hats, representing a range of regions and occupations. Other attractions included a gallery of Hollywood memorabilia and "American Painting Now", an exhibit of 22 large-scale works by contemporary American artists. A 300-seat theater screened A Time to Play, a multi-screen film by Art Kane showing American schoolchildren playing various playground games.

=== Man and His World (1968–1976) ===
After the Expo, the site continued to operate as Man and His World, an ongoing exhibition held every summer. Like most countries at the Expo, the United States donated its pavilion structure to the City of Montreal for use in the exhibition. The pavilion was renamed to Biosphere and opened in 1968 as an aviary and arboretum, featuring four suspended gardens and hundreds of birds.

For the 1971 season, the United States returned to use Biosphere as its national pavilion, with a display titled "Visit USA", sponsored by the United States Travel Service and the Smithsonian Institution. The pavilion reverted to its nature theme in 1972, with the addition of a troop of baboons, a Japanese garden, and a children's adventure area, Sleeping Beauty's Fantasy Land.

In 1973, Biosphere was converted to an anti-pollution exhibit titled "Man and His Environment", sponsored by Hydro-Québec.

The Biosphere in flames on 20 May 1976

=== 1976 fire ===
On 20 May 1976, Biosphere was severely damaged in a fire. Sparked by a welding crew during structural renovations, the fire burned away the building's transparent acrylic bubble, but the hard steel truss structure remained.

After the fire, the city was determined to maintain the Biosphere and continue using it as an open-air structure, possibly containing suspended gardens or a concert venue. Plans were announced in 1977 to transform it into a recreational area named Man at Play, but they did not come to fruition. By 1980, the building's future was still unclear, as the city was cleaning it up in hopes of finding a partner to redevelop it.

Ultimately, the building remained closed and unused until 1990.

=== Rebirth as museum ===
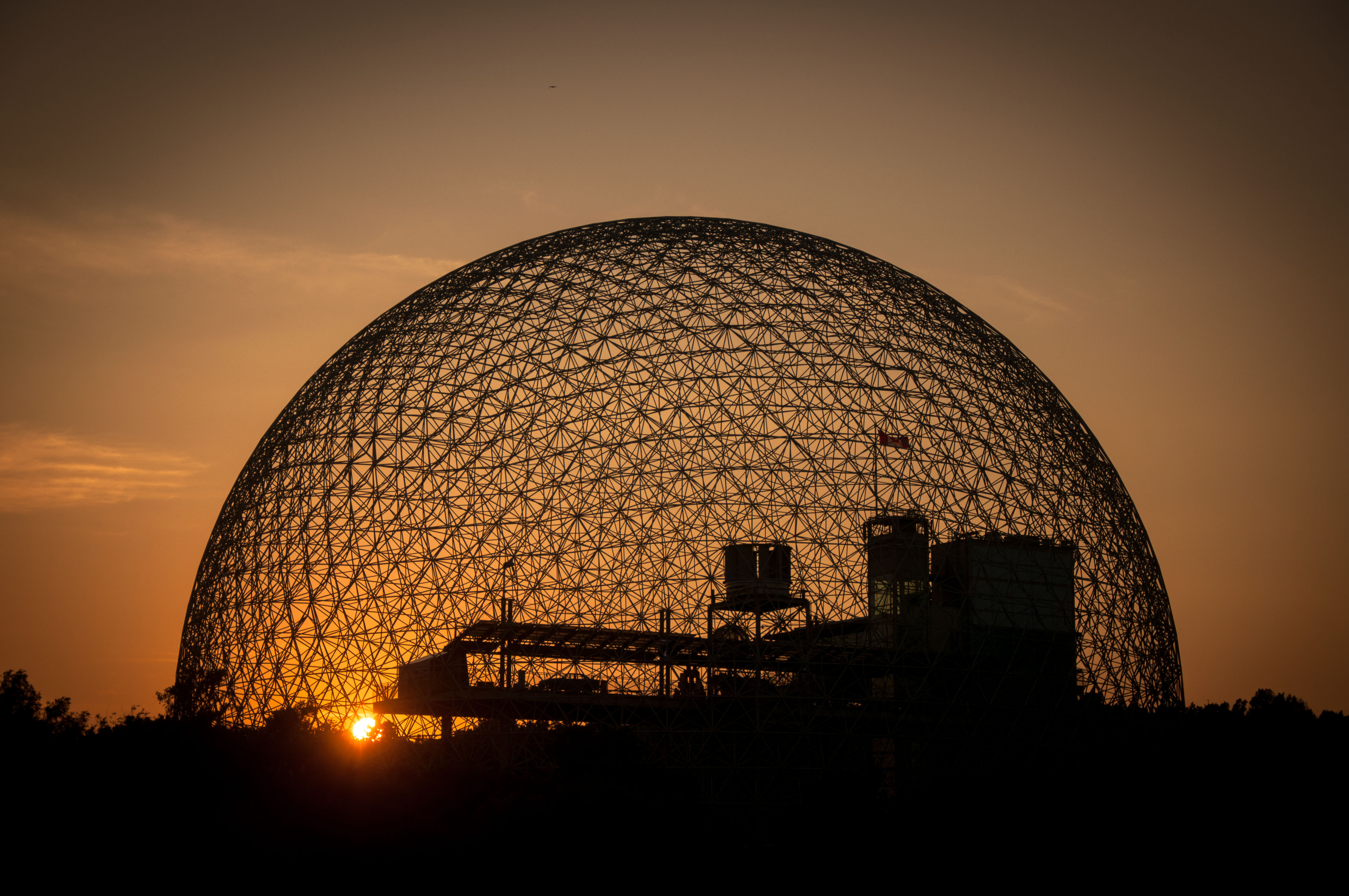
Biosphere at sunset

In August 1990, Environment Canada committed $17.5 million to turn Biosphere into an interactive museum showcasing and exploring the water ecosystems of the Great Lakes-Saint Lawrence River regions. The museum opened on 6 June 1995. It inhabits a set of enclosed buildings designed by Éric Gauthier, inside the original steel skeleton.

The Biosphere changed its name in 2007 to become an environment museum. It offers interactive activities and presents exhibitions about the major environmental issues related to water, climate change, air, ecotechnologies, and sustainable development.

The museum shows support for multiple causes by lighting up in different colors on special occasions. In April 2020, it lit up in multiple colors to show support during the COVID-19 pandemic. In June 2022, the museum lit up in green in support of World Environment Day.

In 2021, control of the Biosphere was transferred from Environment Canada to Space for Life, the City of Montreal's complex of nature museums.

== Pavilion ==
The museum is housed in the former pavilion built by the United States for Expo 67. The architectural engineer of the geodesic dome was Buckminster Fuller. The building originally formed an enclosed structure of steel and acrylic cells, 76 metres (249 ft) in diameter and 62 metres (203 ft) high. It is a double-layer dome in which the inner and outer layers are connected by a latticework of struts.

A complex system of shades was used to control its internal temperature. The sun-shading system was an attempt by the architect to reflect the same biological processes that the human body relies on to maintain its internal temperature. Fuller's original idea for the geodesic dome was to incorporate "pores" into the enclosed system, further likening it to the sensitivity of human skin, but the shading system failed to work properly and was eventually disabled.

Architects from Golden Metak Productions designed the interior exhibition space. Visitors had access to four themed platforms divided into seven levels. The building included a 37-metre-long (121 ft) escalator, the longest ever built at the time. The Minirail monorail ran through the pavilion. In 2021, The New York Times picked the dome as one of "the 25 Most Significant Works of Postwar Architecture".

== Legacy ==
The carbon molecule buckminsterfullerene was named for Biosphere's architect, R. Buckminster Fuller, because the molecule's structure, resembling a geodesic sphere, reminded its co-discoverer, Harold Kroto, of his visit to the pavilion at Expo 67.

The structure influenced the design of Spaceship Earth at EPCOT Center in Walt Disney World. Disney designer John Hench expanded on Biosphere's three-quarter-sphere to create a full sphere appearing to be balanced on legs.

=== In popular culture ===
The structure was used prominently in the original Battlestar Galactica television series episode "Greetings from Earth". Scenes for Robert Altman's post-apocalyptic ice age film Quintet were shot on site as well.

The Biosphere appears in the 2003 animated Jacob Two-Two TV episode "Jacob Two-Two and the Notorious Knit Knapper", in which it is used as the headquarters for a group of seniors who plan on knitting a giant tea cosy to cover Montreal.

The Biosphere made an appearance during the finales of The Amazing Race: Family Edition and The Amazing Race Canada 4.

The Biosphere appears in the game Civilization VI (in the New Frontiers DLC) as a World Wonder, where it increases the appeal of marsh and rainforest tiles, and boosts renewable power and tourism.

== See also ==
- Biosphere – Global sum of all ecosystems on Earth
- List of thin shell structures
- Thin-shell structure
- United States Pavilion at the 1964 World's Fair
- USA pavilion at Expo 2010
- Voice of Fire – 1967 abstract painting by Barnett Newman
