= Expo 67 Mission Impossible =

- Directed by: Guylaine Maroist, Eric Ruel and Michel Barbeau
- Written by: Guylaine Maroist, Eric Ruel and Michel Barbeau
- Produced by: Guylaine Maroist and Eric Ruel
- Edited by: Eric Ruel and Martin Gagnon
- Release date: April 25, 2017
- Running time: 68 minutes
- Country: Canada

Expo 67 Mission Impossible is a 2017 documentary thriller directed by Guylaine Maroist, Michel Barbeau and Eric Ruel on the events that led to the creation of Expo 67. This documentary film presents the behind the scenes history of the 1967 universal exposition through 80 000 archive documents made available by Library and Archives Canada. These archival sources are complemented by interviews with the men and women who organized and put together Expo 67.

== Synopsis ==
The creation and organization of Montreal's 1967 universal exposition was a major challenge for the team in charge of its realization. The universal exposition of 1967 was initially supposed to take place in Moscow, but following the Soviet Union’s withdrawal in 1962, Montreal became host. The event's organizers only had four years to make Expo 67 into a reality, which was a very short delay for such a massive project. Expo 67 Mission Impossible presents the entire process that led to the opening of Expo 67: the planning, the construction of the islands on which the event would take place, the recruiting of countries that would participate in the exposition, the opening, the success and closing day of Expo 67. Furthermore, the film shows how cooperation between team members of various generations and different backgrounds made this success story possible.

This documentary includes interviews with men and women who were involved in the creation of Expo 67, such as Philippe de Gaspé Beaubien II, Yves Jasmin, Nan-B de Gaspé Beaubien and Diana Nicholson.

== Diffusion ==
The premiere of the film took place on April 25, 2017, at the Maisonneuve theatre of the Montreal Place des Arts. This event was part of the celebrations of for Montreal's founding 375th anniversary. Afterwards, Expo 67 Mission Impossible was broadcast on television, on Canal D. Throughout 2017, it was shown in various cinemas across Quebec and Canada.

== Reception ==
=== Critical response ===
The critical response to Expo 67 Mission Impossible was generally positive. Normand Provencher of the Quebec City newspaper Le Soleil gave it four stars out of five. Josée Legault of the Journal de Montreal wrote that it should be a mandatory watch for students and politicians. Adam Sidsworth of the Toronto Film Scene recommended it to anyone looking to know more about a great event in Canadian history. He also wrote that the use of archive material in this film was exceptional.

Jean-Marc Limoges of the website Panorama Cinema gave it a less positive review. He found the inclusion of the construction workers who made Expo 67 a reality lacking in the narrative. Andrew Parker of the website The Gate gave it 2.7/5. Parker states that the topic of the film was interesting and that the challenges faced by the organizers of Expo 67 was impressive. However, he found the film to be too short and lacking in emotional content.
