= Pont de la Concorde (Montreal) =

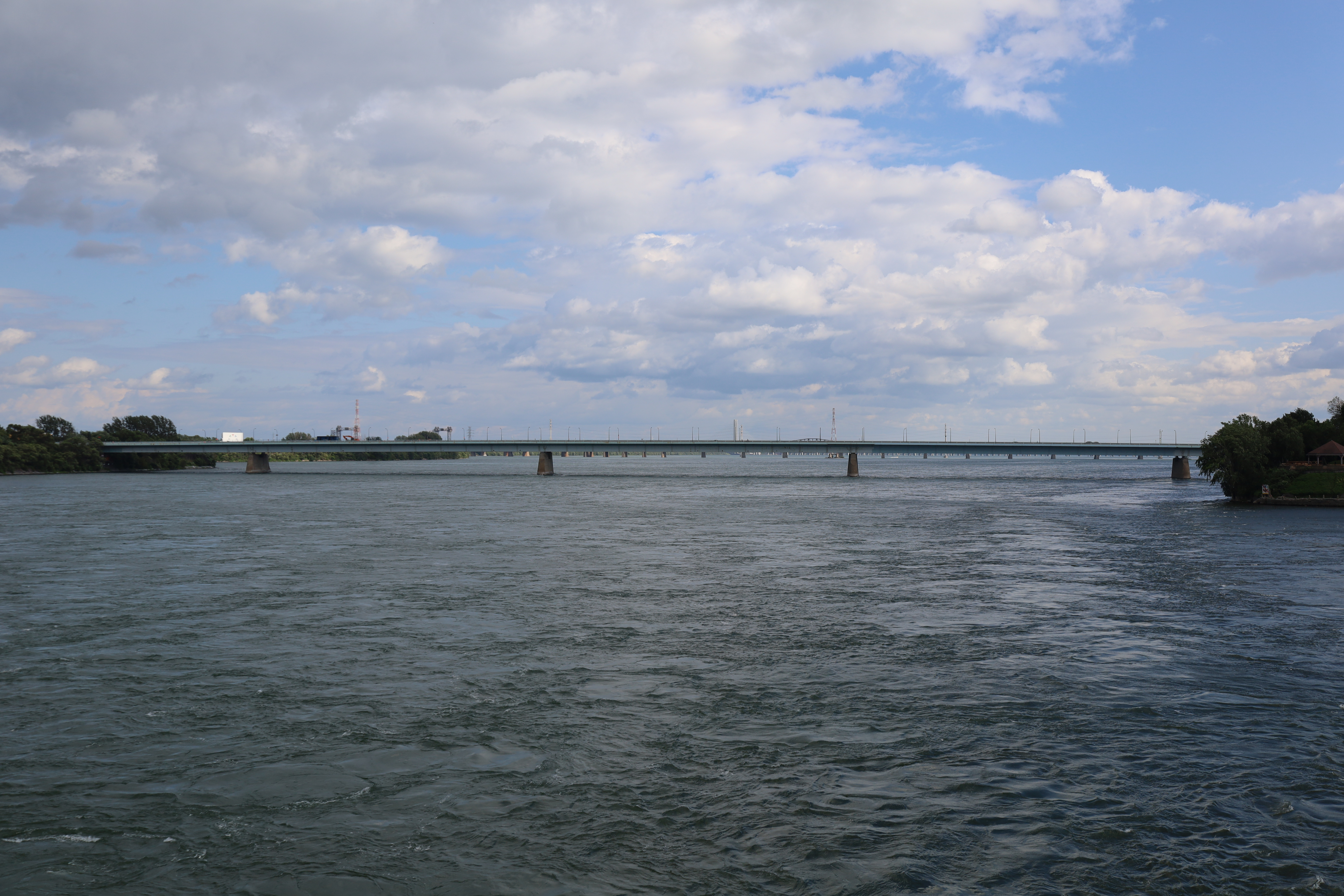
- The bridge in 2023
- Coordinates: 45°30′20″N 73°32′17″W
- Carries: roadway Pedestrians and bicycles
- Crosses: St. Lawrence River
- Locale: Montreal, Quebec
- Official name: Pont de la Concorde

Characteristics
- Design: Box girder bridge
- Total length: 690.4 m
- Width: 28.6 m
- No. of lanes: 4

Location
- Interactive map of Pont de la Concorde

The Pont De la Concorde (English: Concorde Bridge) carries Avenue Pierre-Dupuy across the St. Lawrence River between Cité du Havre, Montreal, and Parc Jean-Drapeau on Saint Helen's Island. Most of its traffic is from motorists driving to the Montreal Casino on Île Notre-Dame and continuing on Pierre Dupuy Avenue across Pont des Îles. The bridge was built for Expo 67 and was used by the Expo Express train.

== See also ==
- List of crossings of the Saint Lawrence River
