= Sue Hastings =

American puppeteer

- Born: Susie Willabell Couch; May 10, 1884; Monticello, New York, US
- Died: June 29, 1977 (aged 93); Coral Gables, Florida, US
- Occupations: Puppeteer; entrepreneur
- Known for: Mastering puppetry, especially marionettes; Once owned and operated approximately 50 touring companies
- Title: CEO, Sue Hastings Marionettes, Inc.

Sue Hastings (born Susie Willabell Couch; May 10, 1884 – June 29, 1977) was an American puppeteer known for popularizing the ancient art of puppetry in the 1930s and 1940s. She studied under master puppeteer Tony Sarg. Hastings was known as a society hostess and for performing with her large collection of professionally made marionettes, which she created with the assistance of her large team of artisan puppeteers. She had many performing companies which were headquartered in New York City, New York, US. During the height of her career, as owner and CEO of Sue Hastings Marionettes, Inc., was directing over 50 performing companies, some of which performed worldwide for heads of Royalty, such as Queen Elizabeth II, and many other dignitaries, national and international diplomats, and world leaders.

== Hasting's Puppets ==
Sometime during the 1940s or 1950s, former Sue Hastings puppeteers Harold "Hal" and Linnea Linsley purchased a portion of the huge collection and eventually moved them to the Dallas/Fort Worth, Texas area. This collection consisted of well over 1,000 marionettes, some of which had been professionally constructed as early as the late 1920s to early 1930s, ranging in size from five to ten inches to well over two to three feet in height, included were puppet caricatures of many famous personalities of radio, stage, films and television.

Linsley, an inveterate stage performer, had been one of the many dancing and singing chorus girls performing as an integral part of Florenz Ziegfeld's "Ziegfeld's Follies" of the 1920s and was, as they say in show business, a " real trouper". Even after husband Hal's death, she continued performing alone with her Hastings marionettes and other puppets. She was seen performing on television with her "Tapper Rabbit" marionette during the 1960s from a Fort Worth, Texas station and later in the 1970s from a Dallas, Texas television station portraying a grandmotherly storyteller with several fascinated children gathered around her rocking chair as she told them the story of "Town East Mall" as an advertisement for the then newly-opened shopping mall in nearby Mesquite, Texas. Linsley continued to perform with her beloved puppets until some years later, during the 1970s, when her declining health prevented her continuing. She did, however, continue to teach her puppetry art to a select few interested students from her Oak Cliff neighborhood home in Dallas, Texas for a few years.

Linsley met Kathy Burks, a Dallas Symphony Orchestra cellist, and mother of two teenagers who were very involved with the Dallas Junior Players Guild which is a group for performing arts interested children and teens. Burk's teens, Douglass and Becky, showed great interest in puppetry and Burk eventually purchased the Sue Hastings Marionettes collection from Linsley sometime during the middle 1970s. Linsley spent many hours tirelessly teaching Kathy and her children the wonderful art of the puppet, especially concentrating on construction, performance and maintenance of the quickly aging Hastings marionette collection.

The Kathy Burks Marionettes have since become the Kathy Burks Theatre of Puppetry Arts and continues to perform at the Dallas Children's Theater and other venues in the Dallas, Texas area.

The company has continued Linsley's tradition of using the collection for performances for many years, but of the practically antique puppets were too fragile to continue using and were retired, only being used for exhibitions now and then. As of January 2019, Burk's two now-grown children, along with employees, are still actively operating the company.
