= List of festivals in Canada =

Festivals of Canada
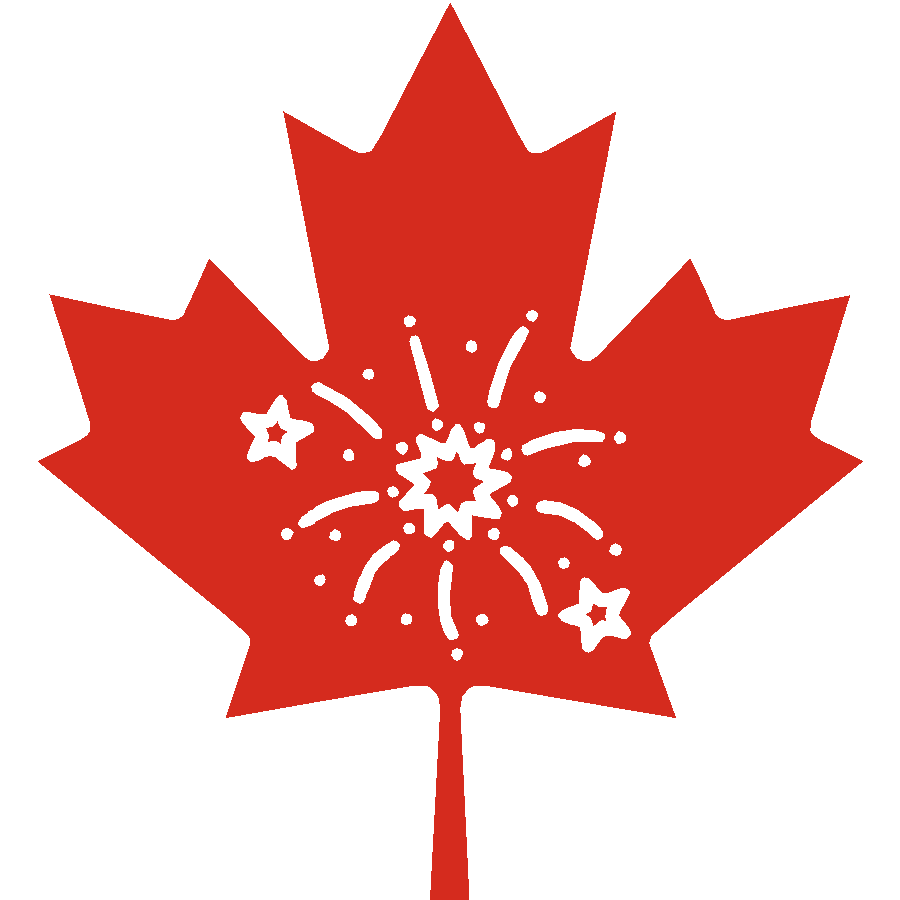

External sublists
- By province: Festivals of Alberta; festivals of Manitoba; festivals of Ontario; festivals of Quebec; festivals of Saskatchewan
- By city: Festivals of Calgary; festivals of Edmonton; festivals of Lethbridge; festivals of Montreal; festivals of Ottawa; festivals of Toronto; festivals of Winnipeg
- By type: music festivals of Canada; blues festivals and venues of Canada

Related topics
- United States); culture of Canada; tourism in Canada; public holidays in Canada

Canada has a long tradition of hosting festivals and events throughout the year. The industry adds over $33 billion to the country's tourism economy and provides jobs for more than 229,000 people in areas like business events, trade fairs, festivals, and meetings. Popular festivals include the summer's Toronto Caribbean Carnival, Canadian National Exhibition, Montreal Jazz Festival, Pride Toronto, Calgary Stampede, Winterlude in Ottawa-Gatineau during the winter, and nationwide celebrations for Canada Day. Other notable festivals include the Toronto International Film Festival (TIFF), Vancouver Pride Parade, Just For Laughs comedy festival in Montreal, and Pacific National Exhibition in Vancouver.

The following list includes festivals of diverse types, among them regional festivals, commerce festivals, fairs, food festivals, arts festivals, and recurring festivals on holidays.

== Sublists by locale ==
=== Province or territory ===
- List of festivals in Alberta (Calgary, Edmonton, Lethbridge)
- List of festivals in British Columbia (Vancouver)
- List of festivals in Manitoba (Winnipeg)
- List of festivals in Ontario (Ottawa, Toronto)
- List of festivals in Prince Edward Island
- List of festivals in Quebec (Montreal)
- List of festivals in Saskatchewan

==== Atlantic Canada ====
Festival	Location	Province	Note
Animation Festival of Halifax	Halifax	NS	
Atlantic Book Awards & Festival	varies	All	
Atlantic Jewish Film Festival	Halifax	NS	
Atlantic Theatre Festival	Wolfville	NS	
Bonavista Film Festival	Bonavista	NL	
Boxwood Festival & Workshop	Lunenburg	NS	
Cape Breton International Drum Festival	Cape Breton	NS	
Cavendish Beach Music Festival	Cavendish	PEI	
Celtic Colours	Cape Breton Island	NS	
Charlottetown Festival	Charlottetown	PEI	musical theatre festival
Charlottetown Film Festival	Charlottetown	PEI	
Corner Brook Pride Film Festival	Corner Brook	NL	LGBT film festival
Devour! The Food Film Fest	Wolfville	NS	
Dutch Mason Blues Festival	Truro	NS	in August
Emerging Lens Film Festival	Halifax	NS	
Evolve Festival	Jailletville	NB	originally taking place near Antigonish, NS
Festival Antigonish Summer Theatre	Antigonish	NS	
FIN Atlantic Film Festival	Halifax	NS	
Great Outdoors Comedy Festival	Varies		Outdoor comedy festival produced by Trixstar LIVE
Halifax Black Film Festival	Halifax	NS	
Halifax Busker Festival	Halifax	NS	
Halifax Comedy Festival	Halifax	NS	
Halifax Fringe Festival	Halifax	NS	
Halifax Independent Filmmakers Festival	Halifax	NS	
Halifax Jazz Festival	Halifax	NS	
Halifax Pop Explosion	Halifax	NS	
Halifax Pride	Halifax	NS	
Hangashore Folk Festival	Corner Brook	NL	
Hellifax Horror Film Festival	Halifax	NS	
Island Fringe Festival	Charlottetown	PEI	
Lunenburg Doc Fest	Lunenburg	NS	
Nova Scotia Gaelic Mod	Cape Breton Island	NS	
OUTeast Film Festival	Halifax	NS	
Stan Rogers Folk Festival	Canso	NS	
Stoked for the Holidays	Sydney	NS	
Virgin Festival	Halifax	NS	
The Word on the Street	Halifax	NS	
Exploits Valley Salmon Festival	Grand Falls-Windsor	NL	
Festival 500	St. John's	NL	
March Hare	Corner Brook	NL	
MusicNL		NL	
Nickel Film Festival		NL	
Shakespeare by the Sea, Halifax	Halifax	NS	
Shakespeare by the Sea, Newfoundland	St. John's	NL	
Sheelah's Day		NL	
St. John's International Women's Film Festival	St. John's	NL	
Tuckamore Festival	St. John's	NL	
Wreckhouse International Jazz & Blues Festival	St. John's	NL	early July
YC Newfoundland		NL	
Acadian World Congress		varies	
Blues d'la Baie	Petit-Rocher	NB	
Festival international du cinéma francophone en Acadie	Moncton	NB	
Foire Brayonne	Edmundston	NB	
Frye Festival	Moncton	NB	
Harvest Jazz & Blues Festival	Fredericton	NB	
HubCap Comedy Festival	Moncton	NB	
Indigenous Film Festival	Fredericton	NB	
Le Pays de la Sagouine	Bouctouche	NB	
New Brunswick Summer Music Festival	Fredericton	NB	
Miramichi Folksong Festival	Miramichi	NB	
Saint John Jewish Film Festival	Saint John	NB	
SappyFest	Sackville	NB	
Silver Wave Film Festival	Fredericton	NB	

==== Territories ====
Festival	Location	Territory	Note
Dead North Film Festival	Yellowknife	NT	
Folk on the Rocks	Yellowknife	NT	
Great Northern Arts Festival		NT	
Rockin the Rocks		NT	
Yellowknife International Film Festival	Yellowknife	NT	
Nunavut International Film Festival	Iqaluit	NU	
Quviasukvik		NU	
Adäka Cultural Festival	Whitehorse	YT	
Available Light Film Festival	Whitehorse	YT	
Out North Queer Film Festival	Whitehorse	YT	
Yukon International Storytelling Festival		YT	
Yukon Sourdough Rendezvous		YT	

=== City ===
- List of festivals in Calgary
- List of festivals in Edmonton
- List of festivals in Lethbridge
- List of entertainment events in Greater Moncton
- List of festivals and parades in Montreal
- List of festivals in Ottawa
- List of festivals in Toronto
- List of festivals in Vancouver
- List of festivals in Winnipeg

== Sublists by type ==
- List of film festivals in Canada
- List of music festivals in Canada
- List of jazz festivals#Canada
- List of Canadian blues festivals and venues

== Festivals by size ==
=== Attendance ===
As of 2025

1. Pride Toronto, 2.99 million
2. L'International des Feux Loto-Québec (Montréal), 2.96 million
3. Caribana Toronto Caribbean Carnival, 2.4 million
4. Montréal International Jazz Festival, 2 million
5. Canadian National Exhibition (Toronto) 1.6 million
6. Winterlude (Ottawa), 1.5 million
7. Celebration of Light (Vancouver), 1.4 million
8. Just for Laughs (Montreal), 1.4 million
9. Calgary Stampede, 1.4 million
10. Nuit Blanche (Toronto), 1.4 million
11. Festival d'été de Québec (Quebec City), 1.375 million
12. Montréal En Lumière, 0.9 million
13. Pacific National Exhibition (Vancouver), 0.9 million
14. K-Days (Edmonton), 0.8 million
15. Toronto International Film Festival, 0.5 million
16. Quebec Winter Carnival (Quebec City), 0.5 million
17. Folklorama (Winnipeg), 0.4 million
18. Carassauga (Mississauga), 0.3 million
19. Ottawa Bluesfest, 0.285 million
20. Osheaga Festival (Montreal), 0.142 million

=== Economic impact ===
As of 2010

1. Toronto Caribbean Carnival, $527 million
2. Calgary Stampede, $172.4 million
3. Winterlude (Ottawa-Gatineau), $151 million
4. Pacific National Exhibition (Vancouver), $140 million
5. Pride Toronto, $140 million
6. Toronto International Film Festival, $135 million
7. Just For Laughs (Montreal), $80 million
8. Canadian National Exhibition (Toronto), $60 million
9. Celebration of Light (Vancouver), $37 million
10. Quebec Winter Carnival, $34 million

== Festivals by type ==
=== Arts festivals ===
- Alberta Culture Days
- Algoma Fall Festival
- ArtsPeak Arts Festival
- Calgary Animated Objects Society
- Eclipse Festival
- Edgy Women
- Festival Accès Asie
- Great Northern Arts Festival
- Infringement Festival
- Kempenfest
- London Ontario Live Arts Festival
- Luminato
- Mondial des Cultures
- MUTEK
- PuSh International Performing Arts Festival
- Sled Island
- St-Ambroise Montreal Fringe Festival
- Up Here Festival
- Vancouver International Sculpture Biennale
- The Works Art & Design Festival
- Westfest
- Woodstock en Beauce
- World Ski and Snowboard Festival
- Yukon International Storytelling Festival

=== Children's festivals ===
- Carrousel international du film de Rimouski
- Northern Saskatchewan International Children's Festival
- Ottawa International Children's Festival
- Winnipeg International Children's Festival

=== Comedy festivals ===
- HubCap Comedy Festival
- Halifax Comedy Festival
- Just For Laughs, Montreal
  - Comedia (film)
  - Zoofest, Montreal
- Toronto Sketch Comedy Festival
- Winnipeg Comedy Festival
- We're Funny That Way!

=== Cultural festivals ===
- Calgary Stampede
- Carnaval de Québec
- Festival du Voyageur, Winnipeg
- Festival of Northern Lights, Owen Sound, Ontario
- Festival Western de Saint-Tite, Saint-Tite
- Folklorama, Winnipeg
- Friendship Festival, Fort Erie
- Glengarry Highland Games, Maxville, Ontario
- MuslimFest, Toronto
- Le Pays de la Sagouine, Bouctouche, New Brunswick
- Pohela Boishakh, Calgary, Alberta.
- Scotiabank Caribbean Carnival Toronto (Caribana), Toronto
- The Great India Festival, Ottawa, Ontario.
- Vaisakhi
- Vancouver Halloween Parade & Expo
- Winterlude, Ottawa

=== Dance festivals ===
- Canada Dance Festival
- Canadian Ballet Festival
- Festival TransAmériques
- Mondial des Cultures
- Thrill the World
- Vancouver International Dance Festival

=== Fairs and exhibitions ===
- Arts County Fair
- Ayer's Cliff Fair
- Brome Fair
- Brampton Fall Fair
- Calgary Comic and Entertainment Expo (trade fair)
- Calgary Stampede
- Canadian Lakehead Exhibition, Thunder Bay
- Canadian National Exhibition, Toronto
- Canadian Western Agribition
- Canada-Wide Science Fair
- Cloverdale Rodeo and Country Fair
- Drumbo Fall Fair
- Driven To Perform (trade fair)
- Expozine (book fair)
- Expo 67 (world's fair)
- Expo 17 (world's fair)
- Expo 86 (world's fair)
- Floralies Internationales de Montréal (world's fair)
- Grande Prairie Stompede
- Hants County Exhibition
- Harrow Fair
- K-Days, Edmonton
- Lilac Festival (Calgary)
- Markham Fair
- Norfolk County Fair and Horse Show
- Ottawa SuperEX (Central Canada Exhibition)
- Pacific National Exhibition, Vancouver
- Queen City Ex, Regina
- Red River Exhibition, Winnipeg
- Rockton World's Fair
- Royal Agricultural Winter Fair
- Royal Manitoba Winter Fair
- Provincial Agricultural Fair of Canada West
- Saskatoon Ex
- Scarboro Fair
- Schomberg Fair
- Salon du livre anarchiste (book fair)
- Sooke Fall Fair
- Spencerville Fair
- Western Fair
- Whoop-Up Days
- World of Commodore (trade fair)

=== Food festivals ===
- Annapolis Valley Apple Blossom Festival, Annapolis Valley, Nova Scotia
- Brighton Applefest, Brighton, Ontario
- Canada's Largest Ribfest, Burlington, Ontario
- Eat! Vancouver, Vancouver, British Columbia
- Exploits Valley Salmon Festival, Exploits Valley, Newfoundland and Labrador
- Sun and Salsa Festival, Calgary, Alberta
- Taste of the Danforth, Toronto, Ontario
- A Taste of Edmonton, Edmonton, Alberta

=== Fringe festivals ===
- Atlantic Fringe Festival
- Calgary Fringe Festival
- Edmonton International Fringe Festival
- Island Fringe Festival
- Ottawa Fringe Festival
- Saskatoon Fringe Theatre Festival
- St-Ambroise Montreal Fringe Festival
- Vancouver Fringe Festival
- Winnipeg Fringe Theatre Festival

=== Literary festivals ===
- Banff Mountain Book Festival
- Blue Metropolis International Literary Festival
- Eden Mills Writers' Festival, Eden Mills, Ontario
- The Frye Festival, Moncton, New Brunswick
- Vancouver Writers Fest
- Winnipeg International Writers Festival
- The Word on the Street

== See also ==
- Culture of Canada
- Tourism in Canada
- Public holidays in Canada
