= List of festivals in Ontario =

Coordinates: 50°42′N 86°3′W

Festivals of Ontario
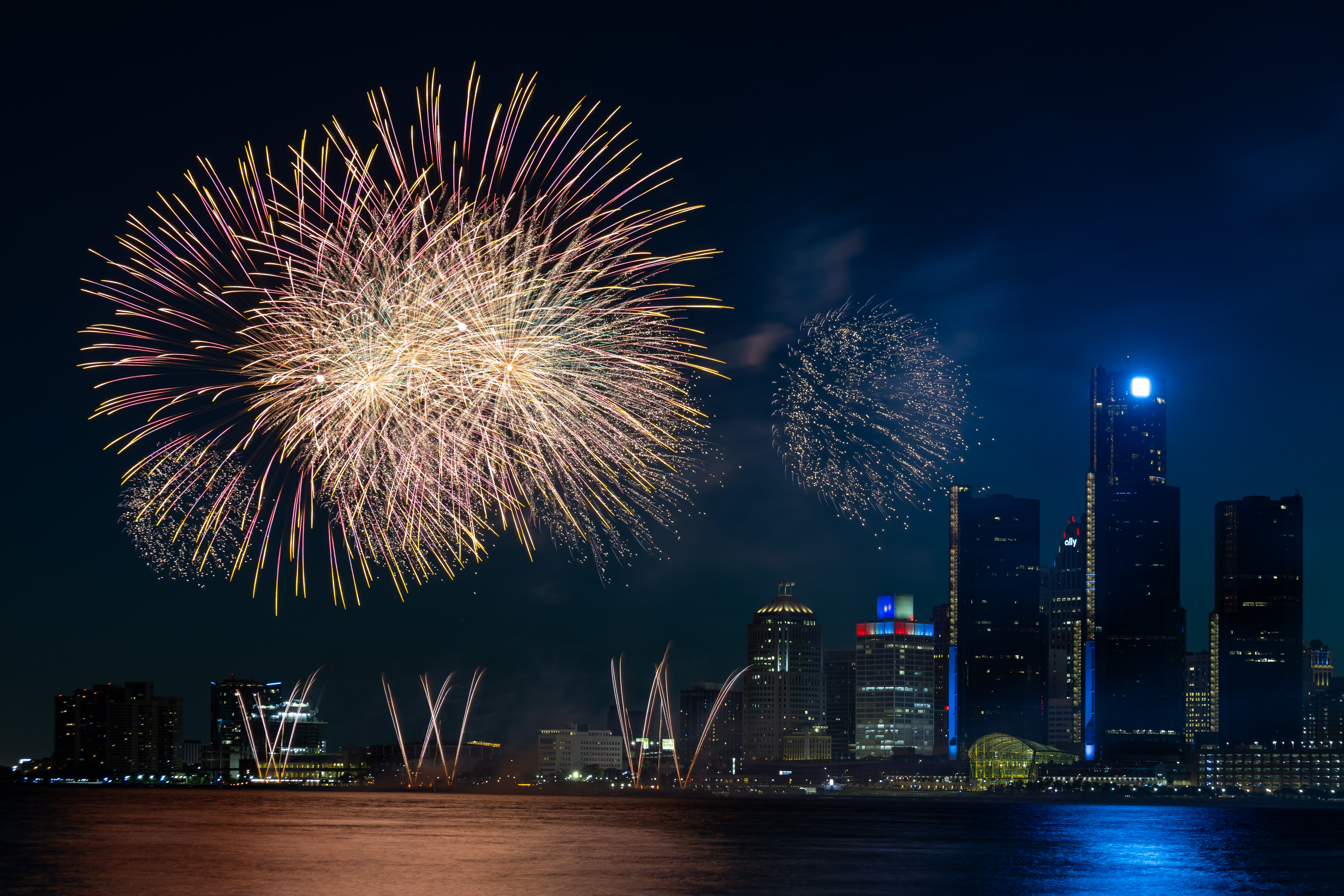

External sublists
- By city: Festivals of Ottawa; festivals of Toronto

Related topics
- Festivals of Canada; lists of festivals by province or region (Alberta; British Columbia; Saskatchewan; Manitoba; Quebec); culture of Ontario; tourism in Ontario

This is a list of current festivals held within the Canadian province of Ontario, Canada.

== Festivals by city ==
- List of festivals in Ottawa
- List of festivals in Toronto

Map of Canada with Ontario highlighted

== Festivals by region ==
=== Northeastern Ontario ===
- Algoma Fall Festival (Sault Ste Marie)
- Bon Soo Winter Carnival (Sault Ste. Marie)
- Cinéfest Sudbury International Film Festival (Sudbury)
- Junction North International Documentary Film Festival (Sudbury)
- Northern Lights Festival Boréal (Sudbury)
- La Nuit sur l'étang (Sudbury)
- Queer North Film Festival (Sudbury)
- Sudbury Outdoor Adventure Reels Film Festival (Sudbury)
- Sudbury Pride (Sudbury)
- Sundridge Sunflower Festival (Sundridge)
- Up Here Festival (Sudbury)

=== Northwestern Ontario ===
- Northwest Film Fest (Thunder Bay)
- Thunder Pride (Thunder Bay)
- Vox Popular Media Arts Festival (Thunder Bay)

=== Southern Ontario ===
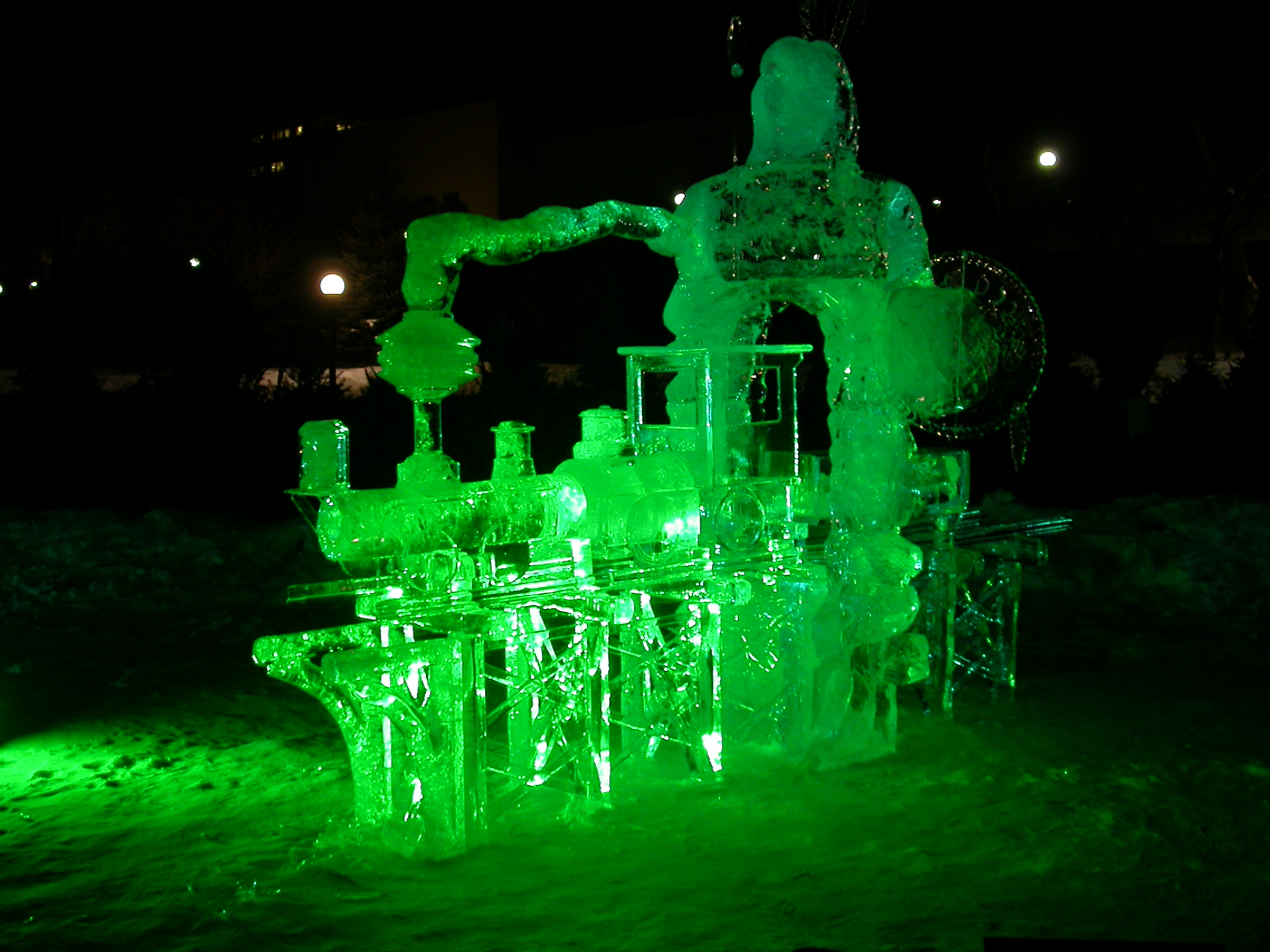
Ice sculptures in Confederation Park are illuminated nightly.

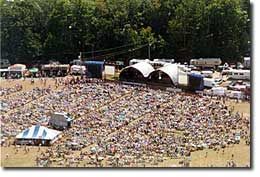
Shot of the twin stages at the Havelock Country Jamboree in 2005

- Bluesfest International Windsor (Windsor)
- Blyth Festival (Blyth)
- Boots and Hearts Music Festival (Oro-Medonte)
- Brantford International Villages (Brantford)
- Brantford Ribfest (Brantford)
- Bridges Festival (Mississauga)
- Brighton Applefest (Brighton)
- Canada Dance Festival (Ottawa)
- Canada Day
- Canadian Filmmakers' Festival (Toronto)
- Canada's Largest Ribfest (Burlington)
- Canal Days (August Civic Holiday Weekend - Port Colborne)
- Carassauga (May - Mississauga)
- Carnival of Cultures (Ottawa)
- CMT Music Fest (Kitchener)
- Downtown Oakville Jazz Festival (Oakville)
- Elmira Maple Syrup Festival (April - Elmira)
- Festival of Northern Lights (Owen Sound)
- Fergus Scottish Festival and Highland Games (Fergus)
- Friendship Festival (Fort Erie)
- Goderich Celtic Roots Festival (Goderich)
- Grape and Wine Festival (St. Catharines) each September
- Havelock Country Jamboree (August - Havelock)
- Heatwave (Bowmanville)
- Home County Folk Festival (London)
- Kempenfest (August Civic Holiday Weekend - Barrie)

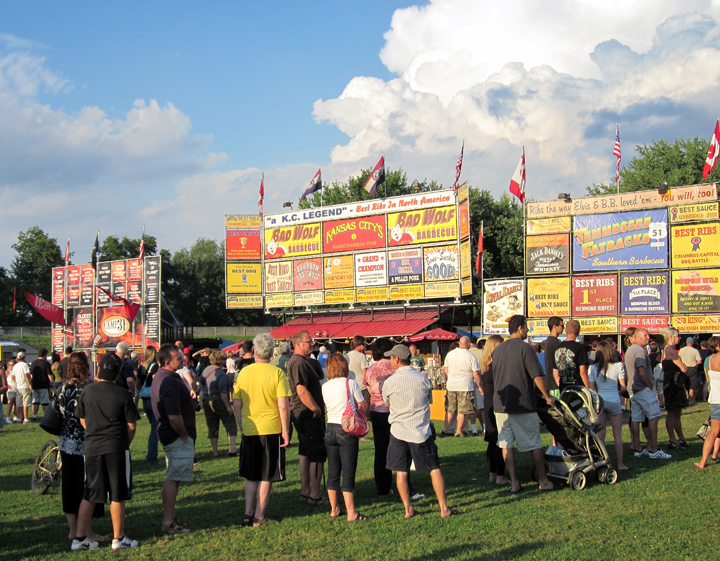
Ribfests typically attract large crowds.

- Kitchener-Waterloo Oktoberfest (October - Kitchener)
- London Ontario Live Arts Festival (London)
- London Ribfest (August Civic Holiday Weekend - London)
- Luminato Festival (June - Toronto)
- Mariposa Folk Festival (Orillia)
- MuslimFest (Mississauga)
- North by Northeast / NXNE (Toronto)
- Nuit Blanche (September - Toronto)
- Ontario Pirate Festival (Guelph)
- Ottawa Bluesfest (Ottawa)
- Ovation Music Festival (Stratford)
- Peterborough Summer Festival of Lights (Peterborough)
- Pride Week (Toronto)
- Puppet Festival Mississauga (March - Mississauga)
- Rockton World's Fair (October Thanksgiving Weekend - Flamborough)
- St. Lawrence Shakespeare Festival (St. Lawrence)
- Toronto Caribbean Carnival - Toronto Carnival (March - August -Toronto)
- Shaw Festival (Niagara-on-the-Lake)
- Steam Era (September Labour Day Weekend - Milton)
- Stratford Shakespeare Festival (Stratford)
- Strawberry Fields Festival (Aug. 1970 - Bowmanville)
- Sunfest (July - London)
- Supercrawl (September - Hamilton)
- Taste of the Kingsway (September - Toronto)
- Taste of the Danforth (August - Toronto)
- The Great India Festival (August - Ottawa)
- Toronto Chinese Lantern Festival (Toronto)
- Toronto Design Offsite Festival (Toronto)
- Toronto International Film Festival (Toronto)
- Toronto Reel Asian International Film Festival (Toronto)
- Toronto Ribfest (July Canada Day Weekend - Centennial Park, Etobicoke)
- Wallaceburg Antique Motor Boat Outing (Wallaceburg)
- Waterloo Festival for Animated Cinema (Waterloo)
- WayHome Music & Arts Festival (Oro-Medonte)
- Windsor–Detroit International Freedom Festival (Windsor)
- Winter Festival of Lights (Niagara Falls)
- Winterlude (February - Ottawa)
- The Word on the Street Festival (September - Toronto)

== See also ==
- List of festivals in Canada
- Culture of Ontario
- Tourism in Ontario
