= Outline of festivals =

Overview of and topical guide to festivals

The following outline is provided as an overview of and topical guide to festivals:

Festival – celebration that focuses upon a theme, and may run for hours to weeks. The theme of a festival might be an area of interest such as art, or an aspect of the community in which the festival is being held, such as the community's history or culture. Festivals are often periodical, for example, held annually.

== The Types of festivals ==
- Beer festival –
- Comedy festival –
- Esala Perahera festival –
- Film festival –
- Fire festival (Beltane) –
- Fire festival (the Japanese festival) –
- Folk festival – celebrates traditional folk crafts and folk music.
- Food festival –
- Harvest festival –
  - Cultural harvest festivals –
- Language festivals
- Literary festival –
- Japanese Cultural Festival –
- Mela Festival –
- Music festival –
- Peanut Festival –
- Religious festival –
  - Calendar of saints (Feast days) –
  - Hindu festivals –
  - List of Sikh festivals –
- Renaissance festival –
- Rock festival – a large-scale rock music concert, featuring multiple acts. Also called a "rock fest".
- Science festival –
- Sindhi festivals –
- Storytelling festival –
- Theatre festival –
- Vegetarian festivals and vegan food fests –
- Video gaming festival –
- Winter festivals –

== Festival activities ==
The activities or events of a festival may be primarily of the spectator or participatory variety, or a mixture of these. A festival may include spectator or participatory variations of one or more of the following types of events or activities, among others.

- Ceremonies –
- Concerts, music –
- Competitions –
- Contests –
- Dancing events –
- Meals, eating, and drinking –
- Parades –
- Parties –
- Performances –
- Races –
- Singing –
- Speeches –
- Sports –

== History of festivals ==
History of festivals

- Feria
- List of Donington Park Festivals
- List of electronic music festivals
- List of machinima festivals

== Specific festivals ==
Following are festivals that are events (similar to a fair). They are typically hosted, and are held at a specific location.

=== Specific festivals by theme ===
- List of celtic festivals
- List of dogwood festivals
- List of film festivals
  - Animation festivals
    - List of international animation festivals
    - List of regional animation festivals
- List of music festivals
  - Blues festivals
    - List of Canadian blues festivals and venues
  - List of heavy metal festivals
  - List of electronic music festivals
    - List of trance festivals
    - List of electronic dance music festivals
  - List of jam band music festivals
  - List of jazz festivals
  - List of reggae festivals
- List of opera festivals

=== Specific festivals by region ===
- List of festivals in Australia
- List of festivals in Canada
  - List of Canadian blues festivals and venues
  - List of festivals in Alberta
    - List of festivals in Calgary
    - List of festivals in Edmonton
  - List of festivals in Quebec
- List of festivals in Colombia
  - List of festivals in La Guajira
- List of festivals in Costa Rica
- List of festivals in Fiji
- List of festivals in Iran
- List of festivals in Japan
- List of festivals in Laos
- List of festivals in Macedonia
- List of festivals in Morocco
- List of festivals in Nepal
- List of festivals in the Philippines, known as Philippine Fiestas
  - List of Bohol festivals
- List of festivals in Romania
- List of festivals in Turkey
- List of festivals in the United Kingdom
  - List of festivals in the Isle of Man
- List of festivals in Vietnam
- List of festivals in the United States
  - Festivals in California
    - List of San Francisco Bay Area festivals and fairs
  - Festivals in Florida
    - List of Florida food festivals
  - Festivals in Illinois
    - List of festivals in Chicago
  - List of festivals in Louisiana
  - List of festivals in New Jersey
  - List of festivals in Pennsylvania

== See also ==
- Holiday
  - List of holidays
