= List of festivals in Saskatchewan =

Festivals of Saskatchewan
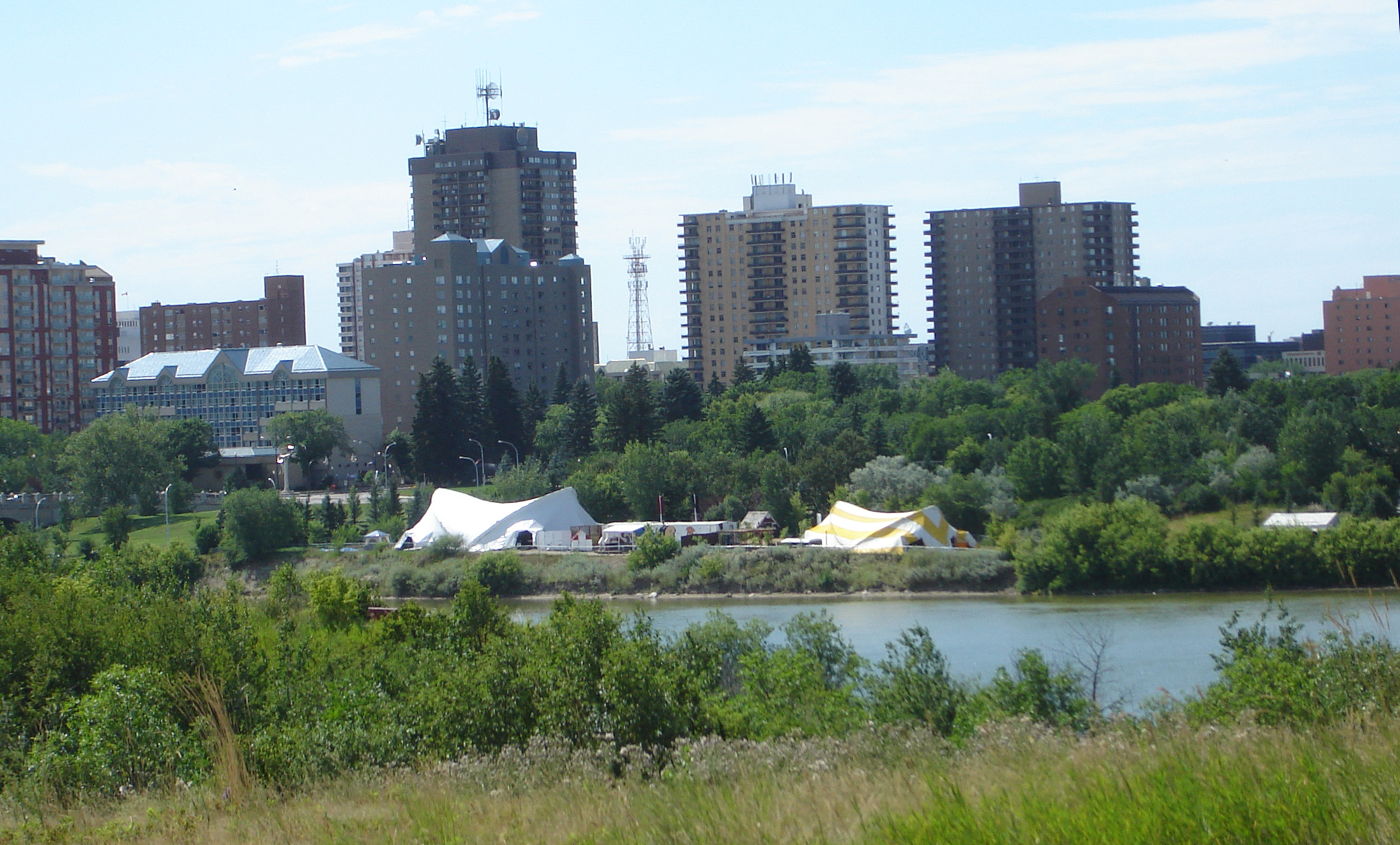

Related topics
- Festivals of Canada; (Alberta; British Columbia; Manitoba; Ontario; Quebec); culture of Saskatchewan; tourism in Saskatchewan

The following is a list of annual festivals in the province of Saskatchewan, Canada.

== List of festivals ==
=== Regina region ===
- Queen City Pride
- Queer City Cinema
- Regina Folk Festival
- Regina International Film Festival and Awards

=== Saskatoon region ===
- Rhythm & Roots Asian Festival + Night Market
- Northern Saskatchewan International Children's Festival
- Nuit Blanche Saskatoon
- Saskatoon Fantastic Film Festival
- Saskatoon Fringe Theatre Festival
- Saskatoon Pride
- Sasktel Saskatchewan Jazz Fest
- Shakespeare on the Saskatchewan
- The Word on the Street

=== Yorkton region ===
- Yorkton Film Festival

== See also ==
- List of festivals in Canada
- Culture of Saskatchewan
- Tourism in Saskatchewan
