= List of festivals in Quebec =

Festivals of Quebec
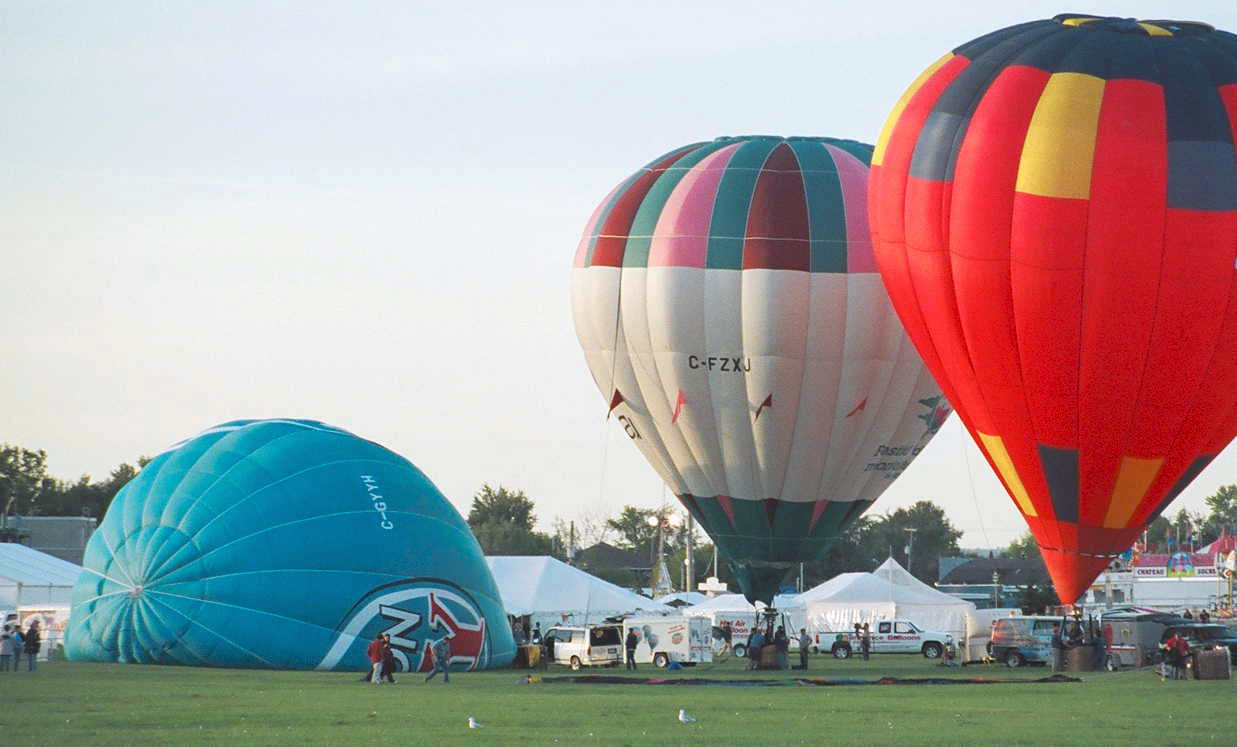

External sublists
- By city: Festivals and parades in Montreal

Related topics
- Festivals of Canada; lists of festivals by province or region (Alberta; British Columbia; Manitoba; Ontario; Saskatchewan); culture of Quebec; tourism in Quebec

This is a non-exhaustive list of festivals held in Quebec.

== Festivals by city ==
- List of festivals and parades in Montreal

== List of festivals ==
| Festival | Location | Genre and notes | Ref |
|---|---|---|---|
| Abitibi-Témiscamingue International Film Festival | Rouyn-Noranda | Film | |
| Animaze Montreal International Film Festival | Montreal | Animated film | |
| Bécancour Hot Air Balloon Festival | Bécancour | Hot air balloon festival | |
| Brome Fair | Brome | Fair | |
| Canada Independent Film Festival | Montreal | Film | |
| Canada China International Film Festival | Montreal | Film | |
| Carnaval de Sherbrooke | Sherbrooke | | |
| Carrousel international du film de Rimouski | Rimouski | Children's film | |
| Ciné-Sept | Sept-Îles | Film | |
| Cinemania | Montreal | Film | |
| Cinoche International Film Festival of Baie-Comeau | Baie-Comeau | Film | |
| Comedia | Montreal | Program of comedy films screened as part of the Just for Laughs comedy festival | |
| Concordia Film Festival | Montreal | Festival of student films staged by Concordia University | |
| Courts d'un soir | Montreal | Short films | |
| Cuisine, Cinéma & Confidences | Baie-Saint-Paul | Festival of food-related films and culinary events | |
| Divers/Cité | Montreal | LGBT arts and culture, defunct | |
| Eat My Shorts | Montreal | Short comedy films screened in conjunction with Just for Laughs | |
| Fantasia Festival | Montreal | Science fiction, fantasy and horror films | |
| FestiBlues international de Montréal | Montreal | Blues | |
| Le Festif! | Baie-St-Paul | | |
| Festival Bach Montréal | Montreal | Music festival | |
| Festival Bières et Saveurs de Chambly | Chambly | Beer | |
| Festival d'été de Beloeil | Beloeil | | |
| Festival de films d'auteur de Val-Morin | Val-Morin | Films | |
| Festival de films pour l'environnement | Saint-Casimir | Environmental films | |
| Festival de Lanaudière | Joliette | Music festival | |
| Festival des traditions du monde de Sherbrooke | Sherbrooke | | |
| Festival du film de l'Outaouais | Gatineau | Film | |
| Festival du nouveau cinéma | Montreal | Film | |
| Festival Filministes | Montreal | Feminist films | |
| Festival Gourmand | Val-des-Sources | Food festival | |
| Festival Images en vues | Les Îles-de-la-Madeleine | Short films | |
| Festival International de Musique Actuelle de Victoriaville | Victoriaville | | |
| Festival Nadeshicon | Quebec City | | |
| Festival Stop Motion Montreal | Montreal | Stop-motion animation | |
| Festival western de Saint-Tite | Saint-Tite | | |
| Fête de l'eau | Sherbrooke | | |
| Fête des Neiges de Montréal | Montreal | | |
| Fête du Lac des Nations | Sherbrooke | | |
| La Fête du Partage | Rawdon | | |
| Fierté Montréal | Montreal | LGBT Pride | |
| First Peoples' Festival (Presence autochtone) | Montreal | Indigenous film and culture | |
| Gatineau Hot Air Balloon Festival | Gatineau | Hot air balloon festival | |
| Heavy MTL | Montreal | Heavy metal festival | |
| Hudson Festival of Canadian Film | Hudson | Film | |
| IF3 International Freeski Film Festival | Montreal | Skiing films | |
| Image+Nation | Montreal | LGBT films | |
| Innu Nikamu | Mani-Utenam | First Nations music | |
| International Balloon Festival of Saint-Jean-sur-Richelieu | Saint-Jean-sur-Richelieu | Hot air balloon festival | |
| International Festival of Films on Art | Montreal | Film | |
| Just for Laughs | Montreal | Comedy | |
| Korean Film Festival Canada | Montreal | Korean films | |
| Longue Vue sur le court | Montreal | Short films | |
| Longueuil International Percussion Festival | Longueuil | | |
| Massimadi Festival | Montreal | Canadian and international films about Black LGBTQ people and issues | |
| Mondial des Cultures de Drummondville | Drummondville | | |
| Montreal High Lights Festival | Montreal | | |
| Montreal International Black Film Festival | Montreal | | |
| Montreal International Celtic Festival | Montreal | | |
| Montreal International Children's Film Festival | Montreal | Children's film | |
| Montreal International Documentary Festival | Montreal | Documentary film | |
| Montreal International Film Festival | Montreal | Film; defunct | |
| Montreal Israeli Film Festival | Montreal | Jewish and Israeli films; formerly the Montreal Jewish Film Festival | |
| Montreal World Film Festival | Montreal | Film; defunct | |
| New France Festival | Quebec City | | |
| Les Percéides | Percé | Film | |
| Plein(s) écran(s) | Montreal | Short films | |
| Pop Montreal | Montreal | Music, film | |
| Quebec City Celtic Festival | Quebec City | | |
| Quebec City Film Festival | Quebec City | | |
| Quebec City Summer Festival | Quebec City | | |
| Quebec City Winter Carnival | Quebec City | | |
| Rendez-vous Québec Cinéma | Montreal, Quebec City | Film | |
| St-Ambroise Montreal Fringe Festival | Montreal | Fringe theatre | |
| Saguenay International Short Film Festival | Saguenay | Film | |
| Sherbrooke World Film Festival | Sherbrooke | Film | |
| Social Impact Film and Art Festival | Montreal | Film | |
| Sommets du cinéma d'animation | Montreal | Animated film | |
| South Asian Film Festival of Montreal | Montreal | South Asian films | |
| Vues d'Afrique | Montreal | African film, music and culture | |
| Vues dans la tête de... | Rivière-du-Loup | Film | |
| Urban Films Festival | Montreal | Qualifying event to select the Canadian submission to France's Urban Films Festival competition | |
| Wakefield Documentary Film Festival | Wakefield | Documentary film | |
| The YoungCuts Film Festival | Montreal | | |

== Gallery ==
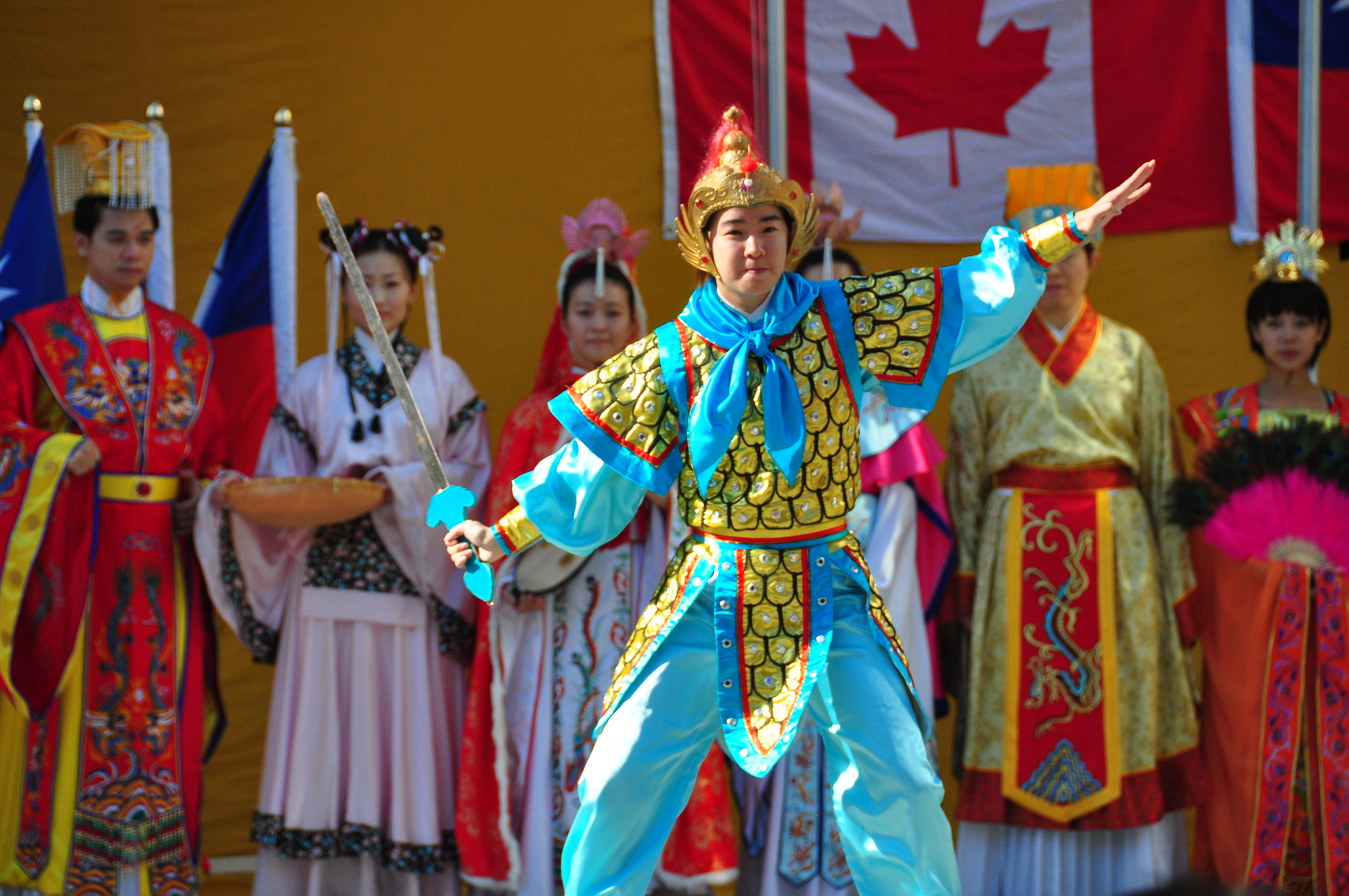
Célébration de la fête du Double Dix Montréal Canada

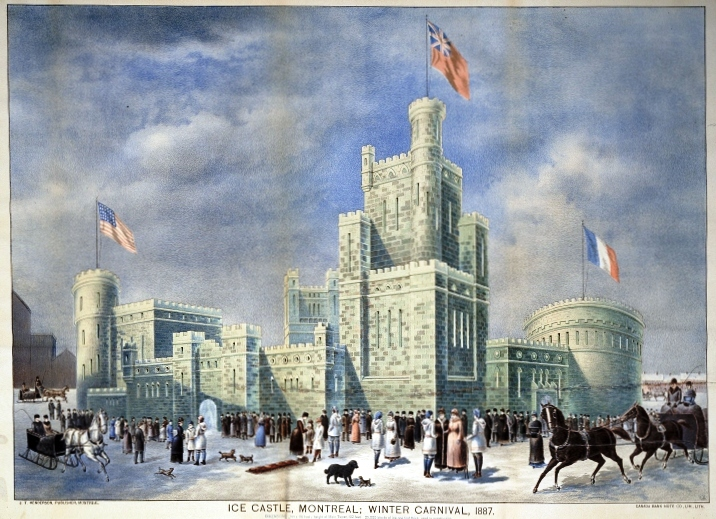
Ice Castle Montreal Winter Carnival 1887

== See also ==
- List of festivals in Canada
- Culture of Quebec
- Tourism in Quebec
