= List of festivals in Toronto =

Festivals of Toronto
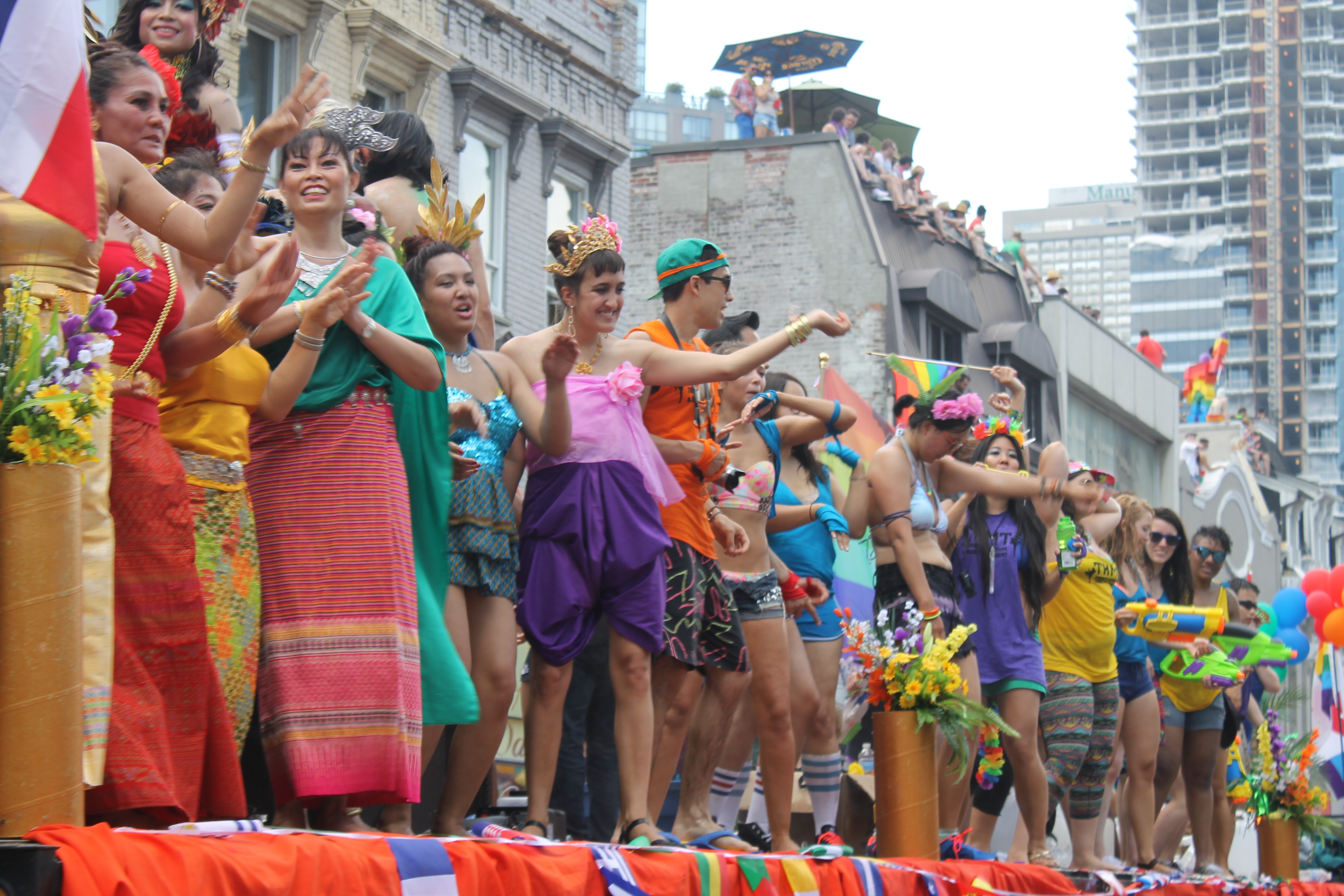

Related topics
- Festivals of Canada; festivals of Ontario; Lists of festivals by city (Calgary; Edmonton; Lethbridge; Montreal; Ottawa; Vancouver; Winnipeg); Culture of Toronto; Tourism in Toronto

This is a list of festivals in Toronto, Ontario, Canada. This list includes festivals of diverse types, such as regional festivals, commerce festivals, fairs, food festivals, arts festivals, religious festivals, folk festivals, and recurring festivals on holidays. The city hosts several large festivals each year including Canada's largest gay pride festival, national exhibition, and film festival.

== Festivals ==
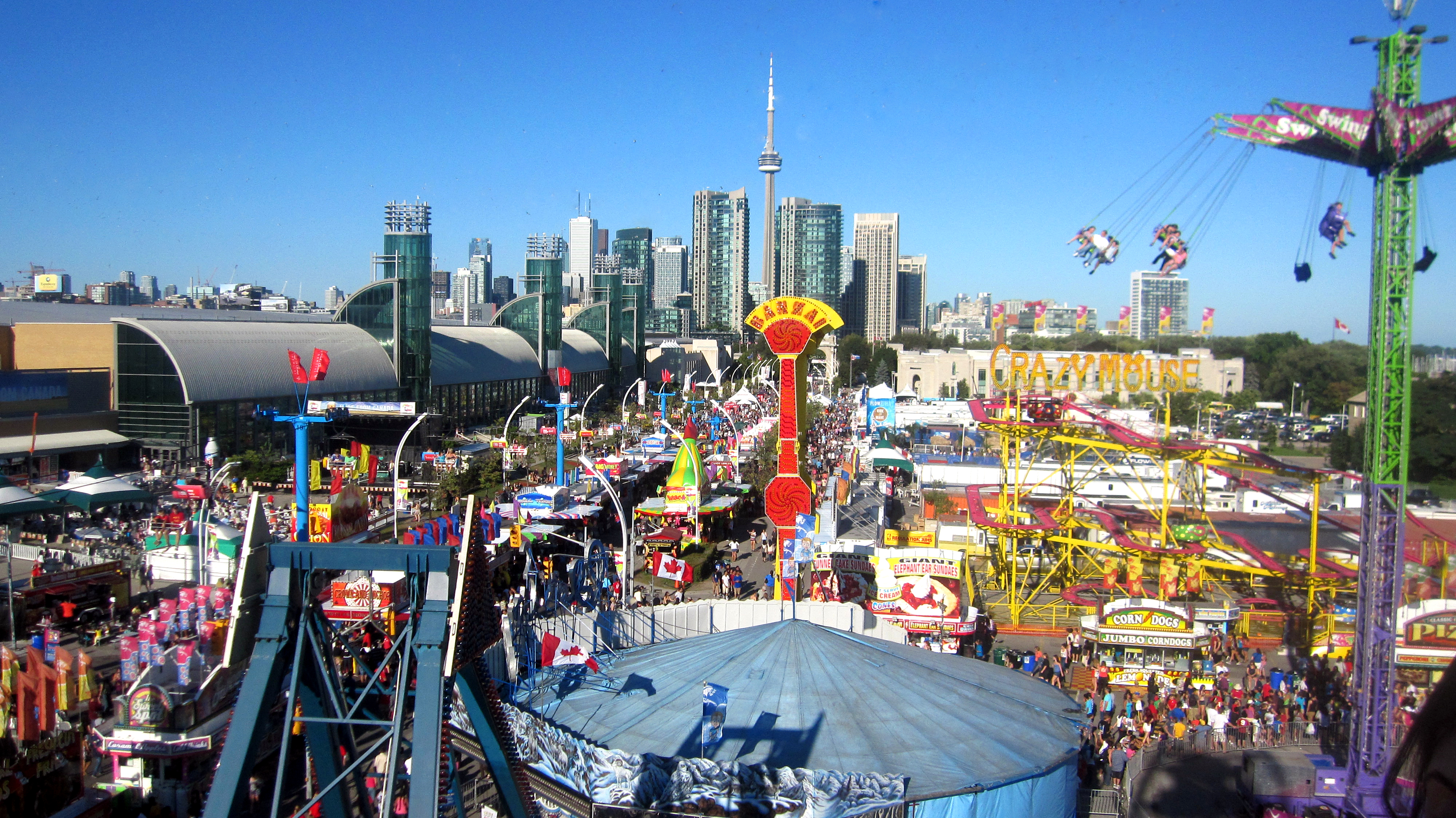
The Canadian National Exhibition is Canada's largest annual fair, averaging an approximate 1.5 million visitors a year.

- BIG on Bloor Festival of Arts & Culture
- Cabbagetown Fall Festival
- Cabbagetown Forsythia Festival
- Canadian National Exhibition
- Cityfest
- FIVARS Festival of International Virtual & Augmented Reality Stories
- Indie Week Canada
- International Festival of Authors
- The Junction Summer Solstice Festival
- Pride Toronto
- Royal Agricultural Winter Fair
- Tdot Fest
- Toronto International Dragon Boat Festival

=== Arts, dance and theatre ===
- Harbourfront World Stage
- International Festival of Authors
- Luminato
- Next Stage Festival
- Nuit Blanche Toronto
- Progress (International Festival Of Performance And Ideas)
- Rhubarb
- Summerworks
- Toronto Fringe Festival
- U of T Drama Festival
- U of T Festival of Dance 2018
- Word on the Street

=== Cultural ===
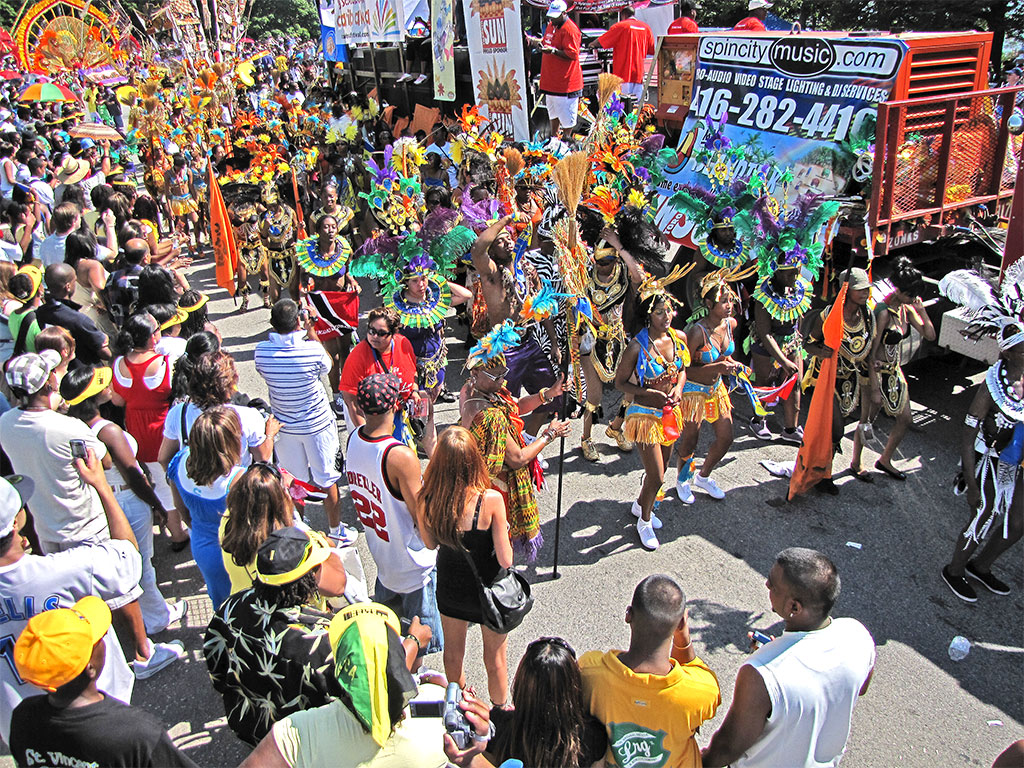
Parade for the Toronto Caribbean Carnival. The festival is billed the largest street festival in North America.

- Ashkenaz Festival of Yiddish Culture
- Himalayan Mela (Nepali festival)
- Latin Sparks Toronto
- Portugal the Festa
- Toronto African Film & Music Festival
- Toronto Caribbean Carnival
- Toronto Chinese Lantern Festival
- Toronto Ukrainian Festival
- Roncesvalles Polish Festival
- Salsa on St.Clair
- Scarborough Community Multicultural Festival
- Scarborough Afro-Caribbean Fest
- Toronto Halal Ribfest

=== Fashion and interior design ===
- Toronto Design Offsite Festival
- Toronto Design Week
- Toronto Fashion Week

=== Film ===
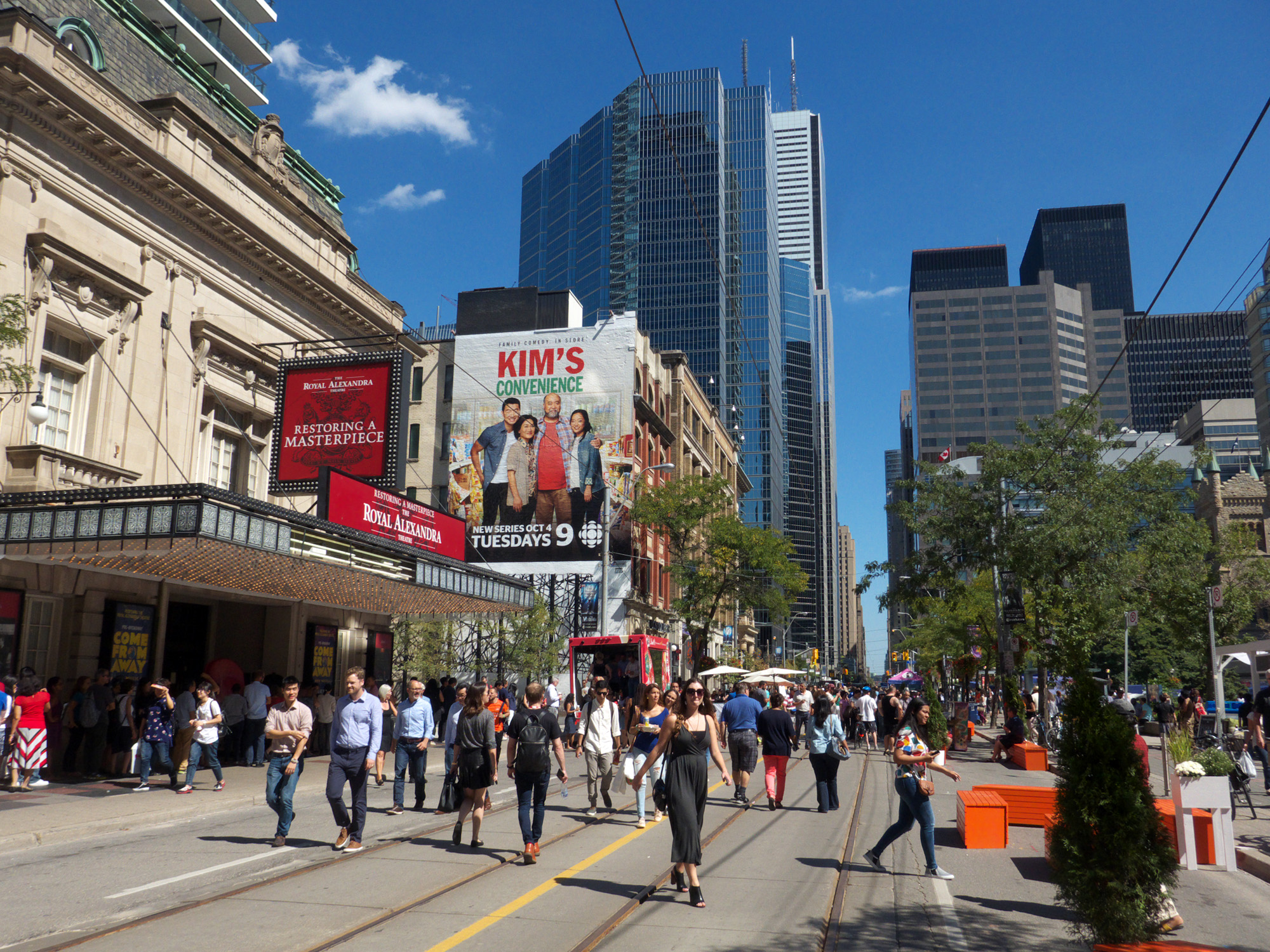
King Street West during the 2016 Toronto International Film Festival. The film festival is held in September.

- Blood in the Snow Canadian Film Festival
- Canadian Filmmakers' Festival
- CaribbeanTales International Film Festival
- Cinéfranco
- Hot Docs Canadian International Documentary Festival
- Italian Contemporary Film Festival
- ImagineNATIVE Film and Media Arts Festival
- Inside Out Film and Video Festival
- Lost Episode Festival
- Reelworld Film Festival
- Regent Park Film Festival
- Ryerson University Film Festival
- Toronto After Dark Film Festival
- Toronto Black Film Festival
- Toronto International Film Festival
- Toronto International Teen Film Festival
- Toronto Jewish Film Festival
- Toronto Queer Film Festival
- Toronto Reel Asian Film Festival
- Toronto Student Film Festival
- Toronto South African Film Festival
- Toronto Ukrainian Film Festival
- Toronto Youth Sports Film Festival

=== Music ===
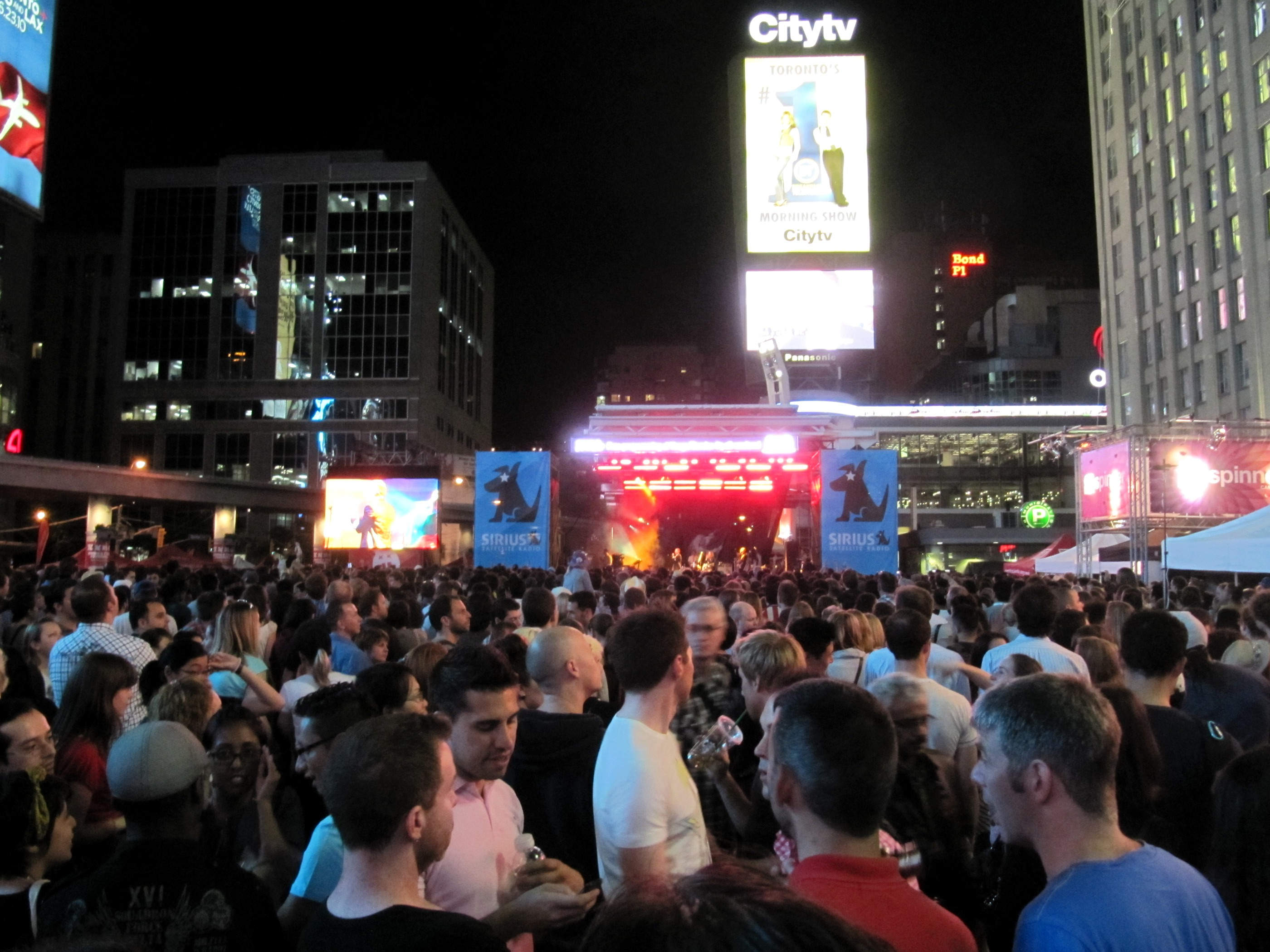
Stars performing at Yonge-Dundas Square (now Sankofa Square) during North by Northeast.

- Beaches International Jazz Festival
- CBC Music Fest
- Canadian Music Week
- Curiosa
- Choral Mosaic
- Edgefest
- Heavy T.O.
- Kumbaya Festival
- Molson Canadian Rocks for Toronto
- MusicFest Canada
- North by Northeast
- Olympic Island Festival
- OVO Fest
- Rogers Picnic
- Toronto Jazz Festival
- Toronto Rock and Roll Revival
- VELD Music Festival
- Virgin Festival
- Wakestock
- Wavelength Music Arts Projects

=== Pop culture ===
- Anime North
- Brickfete
- ConBravo!
- Fan Expo Canada
- Toronto Comic Arts Festival
- Toronto Comicon
- Toronto Sketch Comedy Festival

== See also ==
- Culture of Toronto
- List of festivals in Ontario
- List of festivals in Canada
- Tourism in Toronto
