= List of festivals in Manitoba =

Festivals of Manitoba

Related topics
- Festivals of Canada; (Alberta; British Columbia; Ontario; Quebec; Saskatchewan); Culture of Manitoba

This is a list of festivals in the province of Manitoba, Canada. This list includes festivals of diverse types, such as regional festivals, commerce festivals, fairs, food festivals, arts festivals, religious festivals, folk festivals, and recurring festivals on holidays. The province hosts several large festivals each year including Winnipeg Folk Festival, Winnipeg Jazz Festival, and Winnipeg Fringe Theatre Festival.

== Arts Festivals ==
=== Art Festivals ===
- Flash Photographic Festival (Winnipeg)
- Manitoba Fibre Festival
- Nuit Blanche (Winnipeg)
- Wall-to-Wall Mural & Culture Festival (Winnipeg)
- Winnipeg Design Festival

=== Comedy Festivals ===
- Winnipeg Comedy Festival
- Winnipeg Improv Festival

=== Film Festivals ===
- African Movie Festival in Manitoba
- Architecture+Design Film Festival (Winnipeg)
- Canadian International Comedy Film Festival
- Cinémental
- FascinAsian Film Festival
- Freeze Frame International Film Festival
- Gimli International Film Festival
- L'Alliance Française French Film Festival
- Gimme Some Truth Documentary Festival
- Reel Pride
- Winnipeg Aboriginal Film Festival
- Winnipeg Fringe Theatre Festival
- Winnipeg International Jewish Film Festival
- Winnipeg Reel to Reel Film Festival
- WNDX Festival of Moving Image

=== Literary Festivals ===
- Manitoba Book Awards
- Winnipeg International Storytelling Festival
- Winnipeg International Writers Festival

=== Music Festivals ===
- Agassiz Chamber Music Festival (Winnipeg)
- Back 40 Festival (Morden)
- Bankside Music Festival
- Brandon Folk Music & Art Festival
- Brandon University Clarinet Festival
- Brandon University Jazz Festival
- Brandon University New Music Festival
- Clear Lake Chamber Music Festival (Riding Mountain National Park)
- Cluster Festival of New Music + Integrated Arts (Winnipeg)
- Dauphin's Countryfest
- Fire & Water Festival (Lac du Bonnet)
- Flin Flon Blueberry Jam
- Gimli Blues Festival
- Harvest Moon Festival (Clearwater)
- Harvest Sun Festival (Kelwood)
- Manitoba Electronic Music Exhibition (Winnipeg)
- Prairie Winds Music Festival (Cypress River)
- Rainbow Trout Music Festival (Emerson)
- Real Love (Teulon)
- Rockin' The Fields of Minnedosa
- Salamander Festival (Brandon)
- Soca Reggae Festival (Winnipeg)
- Summer in the City (Steinbach)
- Summer Winds (Victoria Beach)
- Whoop & Hollar Festival (Portage la Prairie)
- Winnipeg Folk Festival
- Winnipeg International Jazz Festival
- Winnipeg New Music Festival
- Winnipeg Punk Fest
- WinterruptionWPG (Winnipeg)

=== Theatre and Stage Festivals ===
- FemFest (Winnipeg)
- Manitoba Drama Youth Festival
- Royal MTC Master Playwright Festival (2001–2021)
- Winnipeg Improv Festival
- Winnipeg Fringe Theatre Festival

== Other Festivals ==
- Ai-Kon (Winnipeg)
- Canada's National Ukrainian Festival (Dauphin)
- CURRENT (Winnipeg)
- Doors Open Winnipeg
- Festival du Voyageur (Winnipeg)
- Folklorama (Winnipeg)
- Icelandic Festival (Gimli)
- Le Rendezvous (Winnipeg)
- Lily Festival (Neepawa)
- Manito Ahbee Festival (Winnipeg)
- ManyFest (Winnipeg)
- Manitoba's Return to Rodeo Festival (Morris)
- Mardi Gras
- Morden Corn & Apple Festival (in Morden)
- Northern Manitoba Trappers' Festival (The Pas)
- Filipino Street Festival (Winnipeg)
- Pride Winnipeg
- Quarry Days (Stonewall)
- Sākihiwē (Winnipeg)
- Science Rendezvous (Winnipeg)
- Sunflower Festival (Altona)
- Trout Festival (Flin Flon)
- Winkler Harvest Festival
- Winnipeg Beer Festival
- Winnipeg International Burleque Festival
- Winnipeg International Children's Festival (KidsFest)
