= Stoked for the Holidays =

Annual music concert in Nova Scotia, Canada

Stoked for the Holidays is an annual all ages music concert held in Sydney, Nova Scotia. The event takes place the week leading up to Christmas. The first "Stoked" was held in December 1998 and the show has run annually with only a few exceptions.

== History ==
Stoked for the Holidays was originally created by a group headed by former local promoter Scott Gillard. Over the years has been organized in association with the Youth Association of Glace Bay, Gillard's LoCL Promotions, a partnership between local presenters Joe Costello and Gillian Hillier, Caper Radio, CBRM ConnectArts, and now indie presenter Under the Underground/Natalie Costello.

== Recurring themes ==
The classic characteristics of Stoked for the Holidays are the "12 Bands of Christmas", 12 mainstage acts that are the main attraction of the show, and the annual "Stoked Afterparty", a 19+ event that takes place at a local bar after the show has completed. There were also a varying number of sidestage performances at the event, short sets of mostly solo performers playing at a special designated area. Currently, the event hosts 6 'bands' and six 'songwriters,' and focuses on youth performers that are driving the re-emergent all ages scene.

In previous years, bands accepted to play the concert have been mandated to include one Christmas song into their set. This has led to many memorable cover songs and originals such as Nothing to Say's rendition of 'Feliz Navidad' and I Was a Spy's 'What Child Is This?'. In 2001, ...And Then They Fall wrote their own holiday inspired song that proclaimed "Scott Gillard (then organizer/founder of the event) is the Devil".

== Association with cblocals.com ==
In association with local website "CBLocals.com", Stoked for the Holidays has been a platform for special merchandise available for the first time at the event. This has included three versions of 'Locals Hoodies', CBLocals mix cds, and even the screening/sale of CBLocals.com creator Harry Doyle's first skate film 'Scenery'.

== Past performers ==
Some of the more notable performers at the event have been nationally and regionally recognized bands such as Slowcoaster, Rock Ranger, I Was a Spy, One Day Late, Greg MacPherson, The Lighthouse Choir, The Town Heroes, Carmen Townsend and the Shakey Deals, and Sprag Session.

December 19, 1998 at Centre 200 A-Team, 50 Ahead, 77 Impala Special, Blindside, F-35, Bravura, The Sellouts, Vicious Basterds, Shawn Purdie, Ladies Room, Room 217, and Dark Waters

December 22, 2000 at Christ Church Hall GuilTRIP, One Day Late, Shortlad, The Rudy Huxtable Project, Face Downe, Slowcoaster, Mission Statement, Nothing to Say, 25% Off, After School Special, Caterwaul, Darkside

December 22, 2001 at Christ Church Hall The Rudy Huxtable Project, Face Downe, Rock Ranger, Nothing to Say, Renfield, Esthesia, After School Special, The Spincycle Squared, ...and then they fall, One Day Late, Radarfame, In Vain, 77 Impala Special

December 23, 2002 at St. Theresa's Hall ...and then they fall, One Day Late, 25% Off, Arusha, Quartered, Rock Ranger, Greg MacPherson, The Spincycle Squared, 3 Piece Suit, i was a spy (formerly The Rudy Huxtable Project), Thrown Aside (formerly Face Downe), Yellow

December 23, 2003 at Steelworkers Hall Riot 72, Undertone, The Loneliest Monk, 3 Piece Suit, Slowcoaster, Violent Theory, Yellow, i was a spy, The Teenage Hurricanes, One Day Late, ...and then they fall

December 23, 2004 at St Theresa's Hall Hulk Out and Kill, Jetavana Groove, The Stereo Arcade, Deathridge, Spasmodic, One Day Late, 3 Piece Suit, Violent Theory, Yellow, i was a spy, The Lighthouse Choir, Slowcoaster

December 23, 2005 at Christ Church Hall Unwanted Echo, Embers and Ashes, Andrew Greig and Arthur Morrison, Airport, One Mercy Granted, Drowning Shakespeare, Erosion, The Downfall, Endless Summer, Violent Theory, Jetavana Groove, Athymia, Richmond Hill, Slowcoaster, Hulk Out and Kill

2006 <<not held>>

December 22, 2007 at Steelworkers Hall 3 Piece Suit, Backpocket Material, Pink Thunder, Vibratronica, Hulk Out and Kill, This is a Blackout!, The Ballroom Massacre, Get It, Get Down!, Carmen Townsend and the Shakey Deals, Ricochet, Madame Brown, Drowning Shakespeare

December 20, 2008 at Christ Church Hall Backpocket Material, Bonum Salvo, Carleton Stone Drives the Big Wheel, Magnum Opus, Pink Thunder, Ricochet, Rufi Jackson, The Roots and Rhythm Remain, This is a Blackout!, Unbidden, Vibratronica, Wrote Off

December 22, 2009 at Christ Church Hall Carmen Townsend and the Shakey Deals, The Ballroom Massacre, Static in Action (formerly Vibratronica), Unbidden, The Luminous Swimmers, Painting Purple, Morals, And Here We Go, Tod Slaughter, The Roots & Rhythm Remain, Mess Folk

December 23, 2010 at Christ Church Hall Static in Action, Unbidden, Stygian Sky, Royal Kush, The Ballroom Massacre, Ricochet, Sons of Nebadon, One Last Salute, Danny MacNeil Band, The company, Thought Machine, Wilds of Borneo

December 22, 2011 at St. Georges Hall Moxham Castle, The Shithawks, Colin Grant Band, Hash Jesus, A.G., Joe Costello and the High Tide, Heartwood Slacks, The Wilds of Borneo, Breagh MacKinnon, Ricochet, Wobblefish, The Town Heroes

December 21, 2012 at Civic Centre Round Room Pioneer Video, Yellow, Adam White, Bella Rebellion, Ricochet, Moxham Castle, The Shithawks, Ladyslippers, Dirty Rabbit Choir

2013 <<not held>>

December 21, 2014 at New Dawn Centre for Social Innovation Background Noise, Quick Nelson, Ricochet, Anthony Tanner and the First Responders, Dead Skanks, Stepwise, Black Tooth Grinn, Lucky Seven, Long Island Road, Every Other Aspect, The Shithawks, Keith Doom and the Wrecking Crew

December 22, 2015 at New Dawn Centre for Social Innovation Mitchell Bailey, Turpentine, Ricochet, Background Noise, Quick Nelson, Superfuzz, Fear and Filth, The Jaynes, Weymouth Street, Kennedy Dale, The Shithawks, Keith Doom and the Wrecking Crew, Alicia Penney, James FW Thompson, Cyrus Orkish, Erin O'Handley

December 22, 2016 at Polish Village Windeath, Riley Hill, Rebecca Lewis, The Camper Vans, The Summer Rabbit, Weymouth Street, The Jaynes, King tha Caper, Abattoir, Zaum, Electric Spoonful, Mercy for the Lost

December 22, 2017 at Smart Shop Place Static in Action, Rob Murphy, 10 Slip, Jordan Francis, Quik Fhix, Breagh Kelly, The High Tide, Julia Fiander, Bailey Shibinette, The Camper Vans, Strongboy, Fear and Filth

December 22, 2018 at Undercurrent Youth Centre Fire Valley Fire, Destiny Tobin, Kadima, Madison and Mitchell, Floodgate, Breagh Kelly, New Draft, Bailey Shibinette, Quik Fhix, Alicia Penney, Seth Williams, Keith Doom and the Wrecking Crew

December 22, 2019 at Undercurrent Youth Centre Mhira Blood, Riley Hill, Justin and Ava Vallis, Vulpine, Trash Brain, Ricochet, New Draft, Colette Deveaux, Beachwalk, Blush, Madison and Mitchell, Kadima

December 23, 2020 (virtual) filmed at the Old Sydney Society Molly Babin and Danny MacNeil, Breagh Kelly, Quik Fhix, Nathan Richards, Gee Stewart, Elyse Aeryn, The High Tide, Jon Creeden, Rebecca Ratchford, Ava Vallis, New Draft, Trash Brain

2021 <<not held>>

December 23, 2022 at Ashby Legion The Wendigos, Ava Vallis, Jordyn, Juliet Carol, Nomad Quinn and Jay Cobra, Fire Valley Fire, Conductor, Avalon and the Pyramids, Brooke Waye and the Noble Rot, 10 Slip, Destiny Dawn, Steve Luxton and Colin MacDonald

December 23, 2023 at Ashby Legion. Alicia Penney, Breagh Kelly, Dazed, Draino, Fear and Filth, Hemlock Pistol, Indee Anna, K.U.$.H, Maletta, Molly MacNeil, Tess Poirier, and Yellow

December 21, 2024 at Ashby Legion. Hash Jesus, Alicia Penney, 10 Slip, Draino, Half Past Nine, Kyra Foulds, Hemlock Pistol, Mark Bates, Great Value, Destiny Dawn, Dazed, and Donovan Doyle.

December 20, 2025 at the Polish Village Hall. Richochet, Dazed, Kyra Foulds, The Summer Rabbit, Yaru, Low Rentals, Molly MacNeil, Tamarack, Mark Bates, Hi-Tide, Danny MacNeil, and The Dist. Iona Revolution.
