= Driven To Perform =

Canadian car show

The Driven To Perform Logo

Driven To Perform (DTP) is an auto show billed as Western Canada's largest and most established automotive lifestyles tour and originally featured mainly import tuner sport compact cars. The inaugural show was held in Vancouver, BC in 2002 as Import Showoff Canada, but has since changed its name and expanded to include other vehicle types and into the other large metropolitan cities in this region of Canada. Major sponsors include Toyo Tires, Future Shop, Mobil 1, Honda, Mazda, Lordco and Visions Electronics.

== History ==
This particular format of showcasing tuner vehicles originated in the Southern California area of the United States with the event called Import Showoff and was the first of its kind. As the Canadian counterpart, this series followed suit and were produced as Import Showoff Canada in 2002 and 2003 until sponsor Toyo Tires purchased the titling rights and renamed the shows to their current name in 2004. In fact, "Driven To Perform" ("au-delà de la performance" in French) is a trademarked advertising slogan used by Toyo Tires. The tour first expanded to include Calgary, Alberta in 2003, Edmonton in 2005, and then Winnipeg, Manitoba in 2008. Although traditionally associated with import tuner sport compact cars, the events now feature everything from street rods to supercars, DUB-style to racecars, and lowriders to classic cars. Streetbikes, RC cars and other specialty vehicles have also played a big part in the DTP shows since the beginning.

== Description ==
As a trade and consumer show, exhibitors market and sell various aftermarket products and services for cars ranging from mobile audio-video equipment to engine oils and lubricants. More recently, non-automotive companies like Pepsi, SoBe and Solo Mobile have participated in the Driven To Perform events to target the young, affluent and traditionally male demographics. Frequently, spokesmodels are present to attract showgoers and to pose for photographs alongside cars. These models are also known as import models or booth babes and have gained massive popularity among those in the import scene and now beyond into mainstream media and pop culture. Increasingly, music (mostly hip-hop, urban and electronica) and dance have become a large part of the Driven To Perform tour. Whether its DJs spinning the latest tracks, up and coming recording artists performing onstage or B-boys and Go-Go dancing, the lights, the sound and the movement are now an unavoidable staple of these multi-faceted events. The Canadian Street Dance Competition held annually within the Vancouver stop of the tour has in recent years grown to become its own standalone show; especially amongst the street dance community. Though conceptually different in theme, execution and scope, DTP shares many similarities and has been compared to the Hot Import Nights series operating in the USA, although much smaller and with fewer attendees.

== Events ==
Driven To Perform hosts one-day events in four of the largest metropolitan areas in Western Canada; usually in the summer, between the months of May and July. These four areas include Vancouver CMA (Surrey), Calgary CMA, Edmonton CMA, Winnipeg CMA, and not coincidentally, three of these are also the fastest growing and only Canadian cities west of Ontario with populations exceeding 1,000,000 persons. They rank 3rd, 5th, 6th and 8th, respectively, in the list of the largest cities in Canada only behind Toronto CMA (Mississauga) (1st), Montreal CMA (Laval) (2nd), Ottawa–Gatineau CMA (4th), and Quebec City CMA (Lévis) (7th).

The shows are open to the public with general admission ticket prices between CAD$15 and $20. Individuals who wish to enter their vehicles into competition at the events must pay a higher registration fee but are typically compensated with complimentary VIP access for themselves. In addition to cars, all DTP shows also feature separate competitions for performance motorbikes, R/C cars, and even a street dance competition for hip-hop dancers.

DTP in Vancouver attracted approximately 12,000 to 12,500 attendees in each year between 2005 and 2006.

== Tour dates and locations ==
=== 2008 Tour ===
- May 24, 2008 — Calgary, AB at the Olympic Oval
- May 31, 2008 — Vancouver, BC at the BC Place Stadium
- June 14, 2008 — Edmonton, AB at the Northlands Agricom
- July 5, 2008 — Winnipeg, MB at the Winnipeg Convention Centre
  - Additional dates and locations may be announced

=== 2007 Tour ===
- June 2, 2007 — Calgary, AB at the Olympic Oval
- June 16, 2007 — Edmonton, AB at the Northlands Agricom
- June 23, 2007 — Vancouver, BC at the BC Place Stadium

== Past/present participants ==
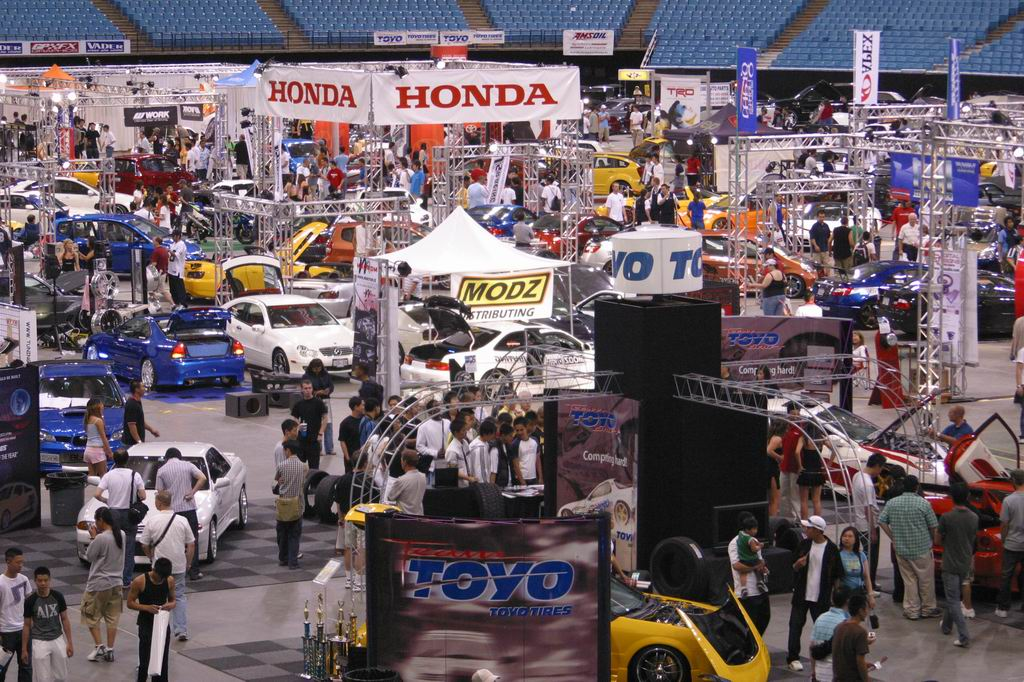
DTP in Vancouver

- Toyo Tires
- Future Shop
- Mobil 1
- GTA Synthetics
- Honda
- Mazda/Mazdaspeed
- Lordco
- Visions Electronics
- Nitto Tire
- Pepsi/Diet Pepsi/Diet Pepsi Max
- SoBe
- Solo Mobile
- A'PEXi U.S.A.
- Mackin Industries
- Exedy Globalparts
- TEIN U.S.A
- Mitsubishi Motors
- Formula D
- Volk Racing Wheel
- Lipton Brisk
- Ford
- Canadian Tire
- Toyota Racing Development
- Dew Fuel
- Dodge
- Sony
- Subaru
- London Drugs
- BMW MINI
- Amsoil
- Eckō Unltd.
- Rogers Wireless
- Mission Raceway Park
- Rockstar
- The Beat 94.5
- FM 99.3 The FOX
- Vibe 98.5
- CJAY 92
- 91.7 The Bounce
- Sonic 102.9
- The Bear
- The Georgia Straight
- Youthink Magazine
- Shark Energy
  - Note: Not a complete list

== Notable appearances ==
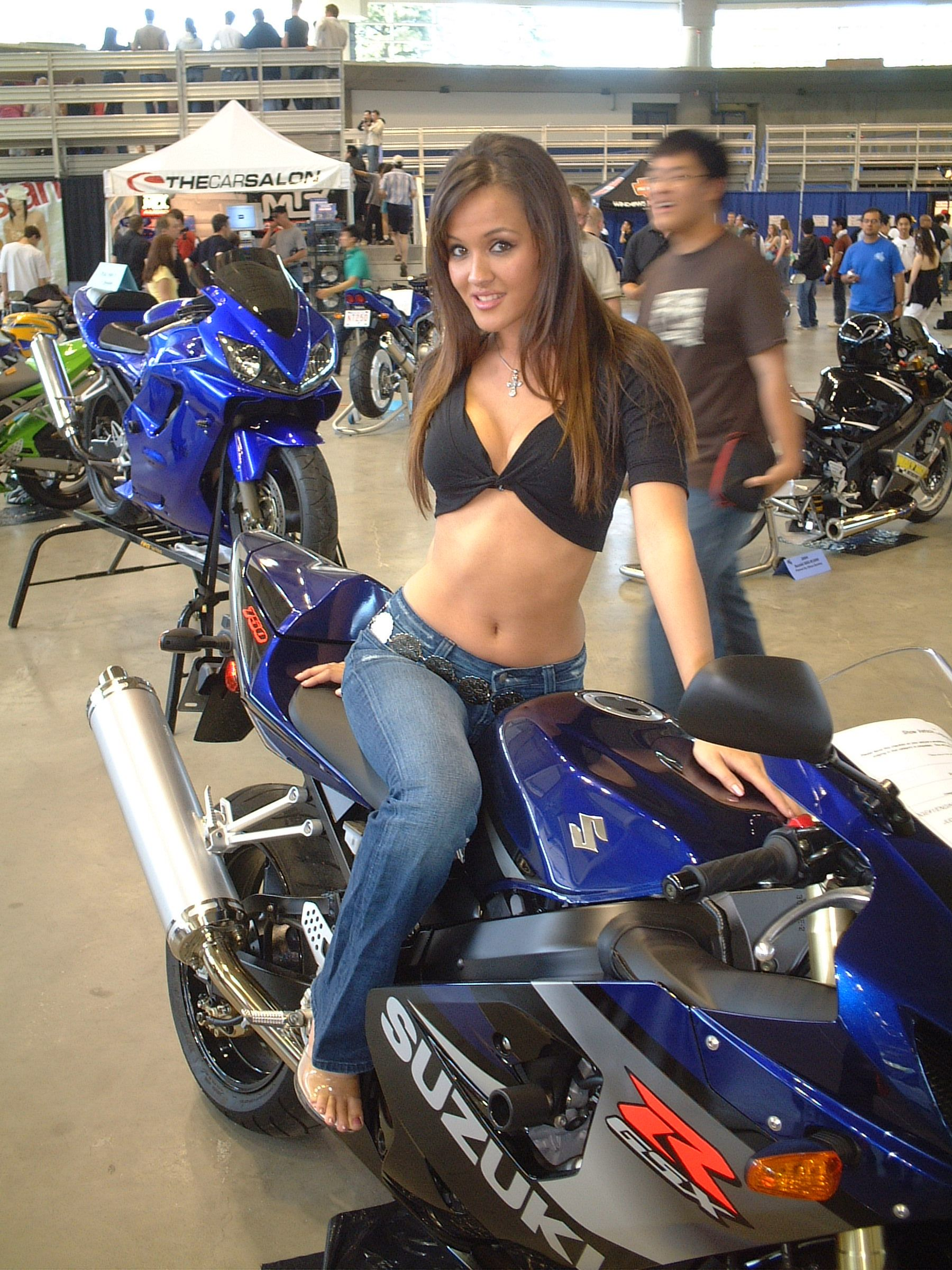
Crystal Lowe at Driven To Perform in Calgary on May 28, 2005

- Kaba Modern, "America's Best Dance Crew" Cast Members, 2008
- Jason "The Athlete" MacDonald, U.F.C. Middleweight, Canadian mixed martial artist, 2008
- Arianny Celeste, Official U.F.C. Octagon Girl, 2008
- Jennylee Berns, "Beauty and the Geek" Cast Member and U.F.C. Ring Girl, 2007
- Melissa Reyes, "Pussycat Dolls Present: The Search For the Next Doll" Cast Member, 2008
- Jayla Rubinelli, "America's Next Top Model" Cast Member, 2007-2008
- Cory Lee, Chinese/German-Canadian pop singer/songwriter, 2005
- Elise Estrada, Filipina-Canadian pop singer/former beauty queen, 2008
- Crystal Lowe, Canadian actress, 2002-2005
- Sunny Leone, Indo-Canadian model and pornographic actress, 2003
- Tiffany Toth, Playboy Cyber Girl, 2008
- Francine Dee, Filipina/Chinese-American model, 2003
- Kaila Yu, Taiwanese-American model and pop singer, 2002
- Mercedes Terrell, Sicilian/Mexican-American model, 2006
- Courtney Day, American model, 2006
- Jeri Lee, Filipina/Mexican-American model, 2005
- KT So, Chinese-American model, 2005-2006
- Christine Mendoza, Filipina-American model, 2002, 2006
- Stephanie Ly, Chinese-Canadian model, 2005-2006
- Misa Campo, Filipina/Dutch-Canadian model, 2007-2008
- Florence Hung, Chinese/French-Canadian model, 2003-2004
  - Note: Not a complete list

== See also ==
- Hot Import Nights
