= Harrow Fair =

Canadian agricultural festival

Coordinates: 42.0332°N 82.9171°W

The Harrow Fair is an agricultural festival that takes place in Harrow, Ontario. The fair is held annually spanning over four days on Labour Day weekend. The Colchester South and Harrow Agriculture Society is responsible for coordinating the event. Their purpose is to promote awareness of agricultural activities and their importance to the community.

== History ==
The first Harrow Fair took place in 1854, at a time when fairs functioned more like sales. They were held quarterly and at different venues, and local farms would volunteer to host the event. Participants, those showing and selling their livestock, seed grains and varying implements required membership to the Colchester Agricultural Society. According to The Colchester South and Harrow Agriculture Society, initially livestock entries were limited to horses, fat cattle, milk cows, sheep, swine, and a few short horn Durham. Today, there is much more species diversity exhibited.

The first annual Harrow Fair took place in 1878. The list of entries had expanded to include home arts exhibits such as crafts and cooking, as well as more diverse agricultural exhibits. In 1880, Colchester Township purchased 7 acres (28,000 m^{2}) of land in order to create establish a permanent fairground. Continual success, lead to further expansion in 1902, as well as developments to the grounds including perimeter fencing, planting trees, building a half mile track, and more. In 1907, the duration of the fair extended over three days. Further land expansion was limited in the 1950s when the high school board purchased the adjacent property. As a result, the livestock barns had to be relocated to a more isolated area. On its 115th anniversary in 1969, the Harrow Fair welcomed the Lieutenant Governor of Ontario, William Ross MacDonald. He arrived to open the fair and celebrate its long life. In 1981 the Exhibition Hall burnt down. By 1983 a new Exhibition Hall was constructed which still stands today.

Currently, the Harrow Fair supports local charities and organizations, such as the 4-H, a youth development organization and the Harrow Whalers Dunk Tank, which raises money for local charity. According to an Essex Free Press article published in 2006, in the same year, 101 pies were auctioned off at the Harrow Fair. The $7,442.50 raised were donated to John McGivney Children’s Center in Windsor, a rehabilitation center for children with mental and physical disabilities.

Recently, the Harrow Fair has stretched over four days. In its first year, the Harrow Fair received approximately 530 entries. In 2008, it exhibited over 7000 entries, and had an estimated 70,000 people attending.

Today, the Harrow Fair is one of the most successful fairs in Ontario.

No fair was held in 1917–18, 1942–45 or 2020-2021.
