= Dead North Film Festival =

Film festival in Yellowknife, Canada

The Dead North Film Festival was an annual film festival in Yellowknife, Northwest Territories, which presented a lineup of horror, fantasy and science fiction films. The festival had a special focus on films made in Arctic areas, such as the Canadian territories, Scandinavia, Greenland, Iceland and Russia.

The festival was first launched in 2012, by Jay Bulckaert and Pablo Saravanja through the city's Artless Collective. In addition to the primary film festival, the event has also organized filmmaking workshops to act as an unofficial "film school" for amateur filmmakers in the region; in 2020, the festival organizers also launched Rated N, a television series on Yellowknife's cable community channel which broadcasts short films previously screened at the festival.

In September 2020, festival organizers announced that the festival would be going on hiatus.
