= Northwest Film Fest =

- Location: Thunder Bay, Ontario, Canada
- Language: English
- Website: Official website

The Northwest Film Fest is an annual film festival staged in Thunder Bay, Ontario. Established in 1993 by the North of Superior Film Association, the festival presents a program of films at the city's SilverCity cinema in April each year.

Unlike many film festivals, which present daily film screenings over the course of their runs, the Northwest Film Fest screens all of its films on two successive Sundays.

== History ==
The event was started when founders noticed a lack of film festivals in the area, after having only student-made films from the Confederation College film festival and a single festival held by the Lakehead University Film Society. The first Northwest Film Fest was held at the Paramount Theatre and attracted 2300 patrons. It would be held in the following years at the Oldeon Victoria and later, the Cumberland Cinema Centre, which allowed organizers to expand the lineup to 18 titles.
