= Winnipeg International Writers Festival =

The Winnipeg International Writers Festival is a Winnipeg, Manitoba-based organization that puts together an annual literary festival known as Plume Winnipeg. The festival program runs for a week each fall, and there are also several off-season events regularly occurring throughout the year. Programming is available in both English and French. While most of the events occur in Winnipeg, there are also some at Brandon University and throughout the province.

== History ==
The Winnipeg International Writers Festival was founded by Andris Taskans, Mark Steven Morton, and Robyn Maharaj in 1996, with the first festival running from October 14 to 19 of the following year. The festival hosted approximately 50 writers from across Canada and around the world. The creation of the festival was explained as follows:

"It grew out of the determination to see that the writing, reading and publishing community was being served the way other [Winnipeg] cultural communities were being served.

"You have music aficionados being offered events such as the Jazz Festival and the New Music Festival, theatre-goers have the Fringe Festival - we're a festival town. People like to have large-scale events which offer them a lot of choice and that's what we wanted to do for the writing community." - Paula Kelly, coordinator for the 1997 Winnipeg Writers Festival, quoted in The Manitoban.

The festival involved collaboration from a number of organizations, including Prairie Fire, the Manitoba Writers' Guild, the West End Cultural Centre (which had previously hosted a Word on the Street series), the Interfaith Marriage and Family Institute, and the University of Winnipeg.
