= Language festival =

Language festival may refer to:

- Adelaide Language Festival
- Language festival (Esperanto)
- Meitei language festival (Manipuri language festival)
- Langfest (Montreal)
- Polyglot Gathering
- Polyglot Conference
- Asiaglot Language Festival
- Poliglotar
