= Festival Accès Asie =

Annual Asian art festival in Montréal

- Genre: Multidisciplinary festival of Asian art
- Locations: Montreal, Quebec, Canada
- Years active: 1995
- Founders: Janet Lumb and Bernard Truong
- Website: accesasie.com

Festival Accès Asie is an Asian multidisciplinary art festival which takes place annually in Montreal in order to celebrate Asian Heritage Month. The festival presents Canadian artists with Asian origins.

== History ==
Festival Accès Asie was formed as the Montreal Asian Heritage Festival and founded on an Asian Heritage Month mandate which was established in the United States in 1976. This was further developed by the Toronto Asian Heritage Month Group in 1993. The Toronto Asian Heritage Month does not exist anymore. The national network of Asian Heritage Month groups and activities vary in mandate from arts presentations to forums, discussions to tributes of outstanding members from the Asian Canadian communities. The Montreal version of this mandate was revised to reflect the city's cultural climate.

Festival Accès Asie was created in 1995, and is the oldest Asian Heritage Month organization in Canada. The festival strives to create an environment for the promotion of art and culture of Canadian with Asian origin in Québec. Events are organized to highlight all artistic disciplines, including dance, comedy, theatre, video, film, visual arts, culinary art, music, poetry and new media. Artists come from over twenty countries: East Asia (Japan, China, Korea); Southeast Asia (Philippines, Indonesia, Malaysia, Vietnam, Thailand, Singapore); South Asia (Pakistan, India, Nepal, Sri Lanka); Central & Middle Eastern Asia (Turkey, Iran, Iraq, Lebanon, Syria, Afghanistan and Armenia).

Under the leadership of General Manager and artistic director, Khosro Berahmandi, Festival Accès Asie is a predominantly volunteer-based festival run by a small staff of employees and interns, a board of directors composed of artists and members of the Asian community, and an Honorary Advisory Committee. In addition to federal and provincial funding organizations, the festival benefits from the generous support of partners, collaborators and sponsors. Festival Accès Asie is a bilingual organization offering events and activities in both official languages.

== Activities and mandate ==
May is the Asian Heritage Month, and Festival Accès Asie organizes a wide range of diverse cultural and artistic events. The festival is also present at Culture Days that takes place over three days in late September since 1997 whose founding body is "Culture for all". Each year this organization mobilizes other cultural organizations to offer the public many free artistic activities.
