= HubCap Comedy Festival =

Canadian comedy festival

Coordinates: 46.0884°N 64.7791°W

The HubCap Comedy Festival (French: Festival de l'humour HubCap) is an annual festival of Canadian comedic talent, taking place in Greater Moncton, New Brunswick and surrounding areas. The festival features stand-up comedy and sketches, among other genres of comedy.

== See also ==
- List of events in Greater Moncton
