= Downtown Oakville Jazz Festival =

Jazz festival in Oakville, Ontario

- Genre: Jazz
- Dates: August
- Location(s): Oakville, Ontario, Canada
- Coordinates: 43°27′N 79°41′W
- Years active: 1993–present
- Website: oakvillejazz.com

The Downtown Oakville Jazz Festival is an annual jazz festival in Oakville, Ontario that has taken place since 1993. The festival is produced by volunteers and coordinated by the Downtown Oakville Business Improvement Area. It is funded by the BIA and other sponsors to make the outdoor festival free to the public.

Both local and international musicians perform during the two-day event. Past performers have included: Big Rude Jake, Matt Dusk, Jeff Healey, Warren Hill, Molly Johnson, Michael Kaeshammer, Johannes Linstead, Chuck Mangione, Rachel Z, The Shuffle Demons, Jimmy Smith, Carol Welsman, The Yellowjackets, and Alexander Zonjic.
