= Halifax Fringe Festival =

Fringe festival in Nova Scotia

Halifax Fringe
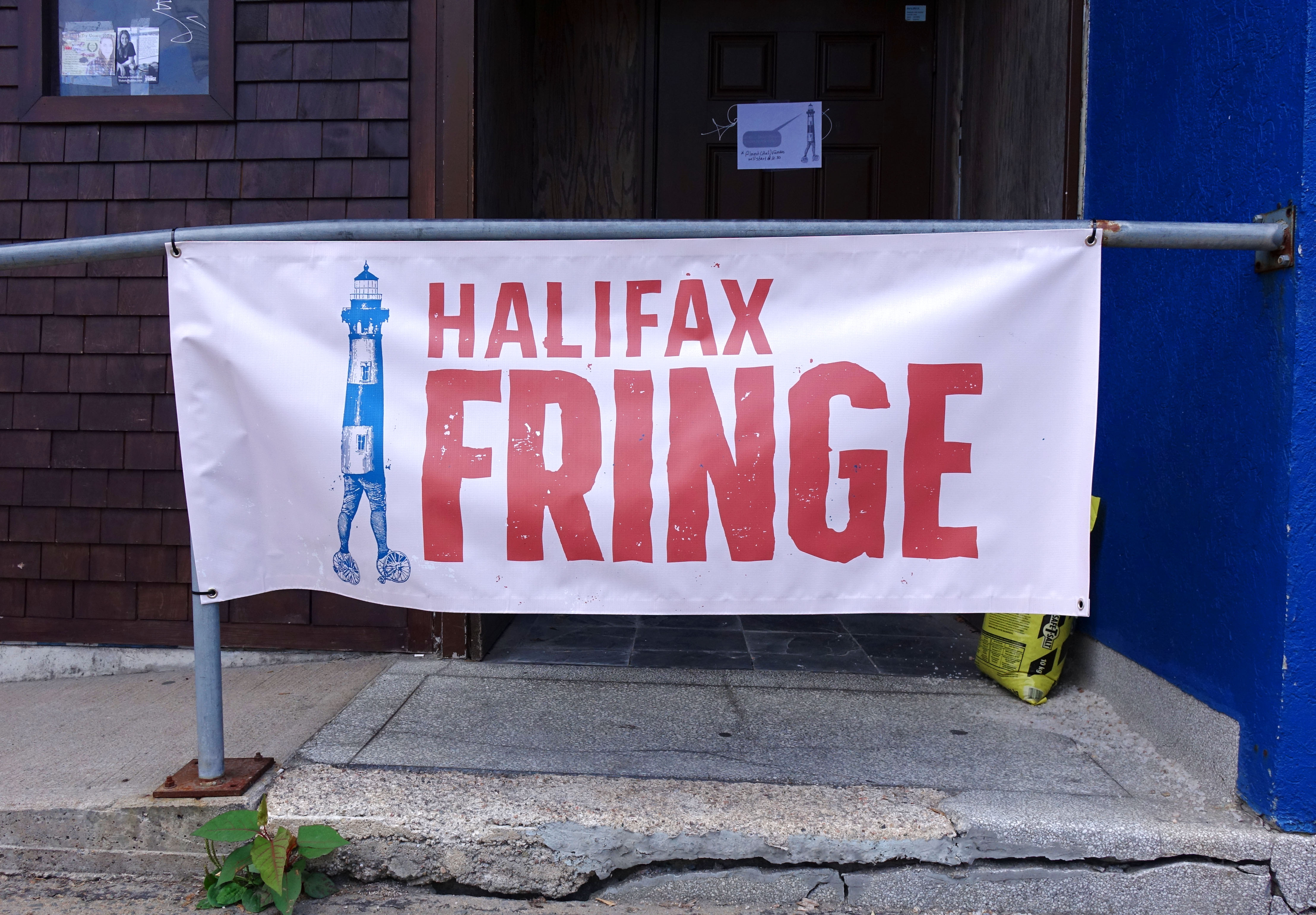
- Halifax Fringe in 2018
- Location: Halifax, Nova Scotia, Canada
- Founded: 1991
- Type of play(s): Fringe festival, performing arts
- Festival date: September 3-13, 2020
- Website: Official website

The Halifax Fringe Festival, formerly known as the Atlantic Fringe Festival, is held annually in late August and early September in Halifax, Nova Scotia, Canada. Since 1991, the festival has been a showcase for non-mainstream theatre. A wide variety of original plays, shows, and presentations are performed.

== History ==
Atlantic Fringe Festival Society was incorporated in 1990 and the first Atlantic Fringe Festival took place in 1991. Ken Pinto ran the festival from its inception for twenty years. After an open letter of complaint by performer Mikaela Dyke, Pinto stepped down amidst controversy about the future of the festival after the 20th edition of the festival in 2010. A new board of directors assumed responsibility for the 21st edition of the festival in 2011. Thom Fitzgerald assumed the position of Festival Director that year, succeeded by playwright Lee-Anne Poole in 2015.

In 2011, the #1 Atlantic Fringe Hit was "Rainer Hirsch's Victor Borge".

In 2012, the #1 Atlantic Fringe Hit was "Confessions of a Mormon Boy" by Steven Fales

Performances take place at different venues in downtown Halifax and change year to year. Atlantic Fringe Festival more than doubled its audience between 2010 and 2012, with 9,393 individual tickets issued for the 22nd edition.

The name was changed for Halifax Fringe Festival in 2017 for the 27th edition.

== Shows and attractions ==
The 2008 festival featured over 250 performances of more than 40 different shows, including musicals, dramas, comedies, and dance. The 2012 festival featured over 300 performances of more than 50 different shows, including musicals, dramas, comedies, and dance.

== Cost ==
Tickets for each performance are sold individually. Price per ticket ranges from $2-$15 Canadian (2020).

== See also ==
- Fringe theatre
