= Rockin the Rocks =

Annual rock festival held in Yellowknife, Canada

Rockin the Rocks is a one-day rock festival held in support of the Folks on the Rocks Festival held in Yellowknife, Northwest Territories, Canada every summer, on September 1.

== 2007 ==
The first ever Rockin the Rocks was held at the Folks on the Rocks area, it featured Canadian bands Hedley, and Faber Drive. Local bands included Priscilla's Revenge, Godson and 3 Across Dee Eye. Just after, they featured Detroit duo The White Stripes.

== 2008 ==
It is rumored that country music legend George Jones, and Kenny Chesney will take part. It is also rumored that Canadian Post-grunge band Three Days Grace will be taking part, no sources back it up. Big & Rich, and Econoline Crush are scheduled to perform.

== See also ==
- List of music festivals in Canada
