= International Percussion Festival =

Music festival

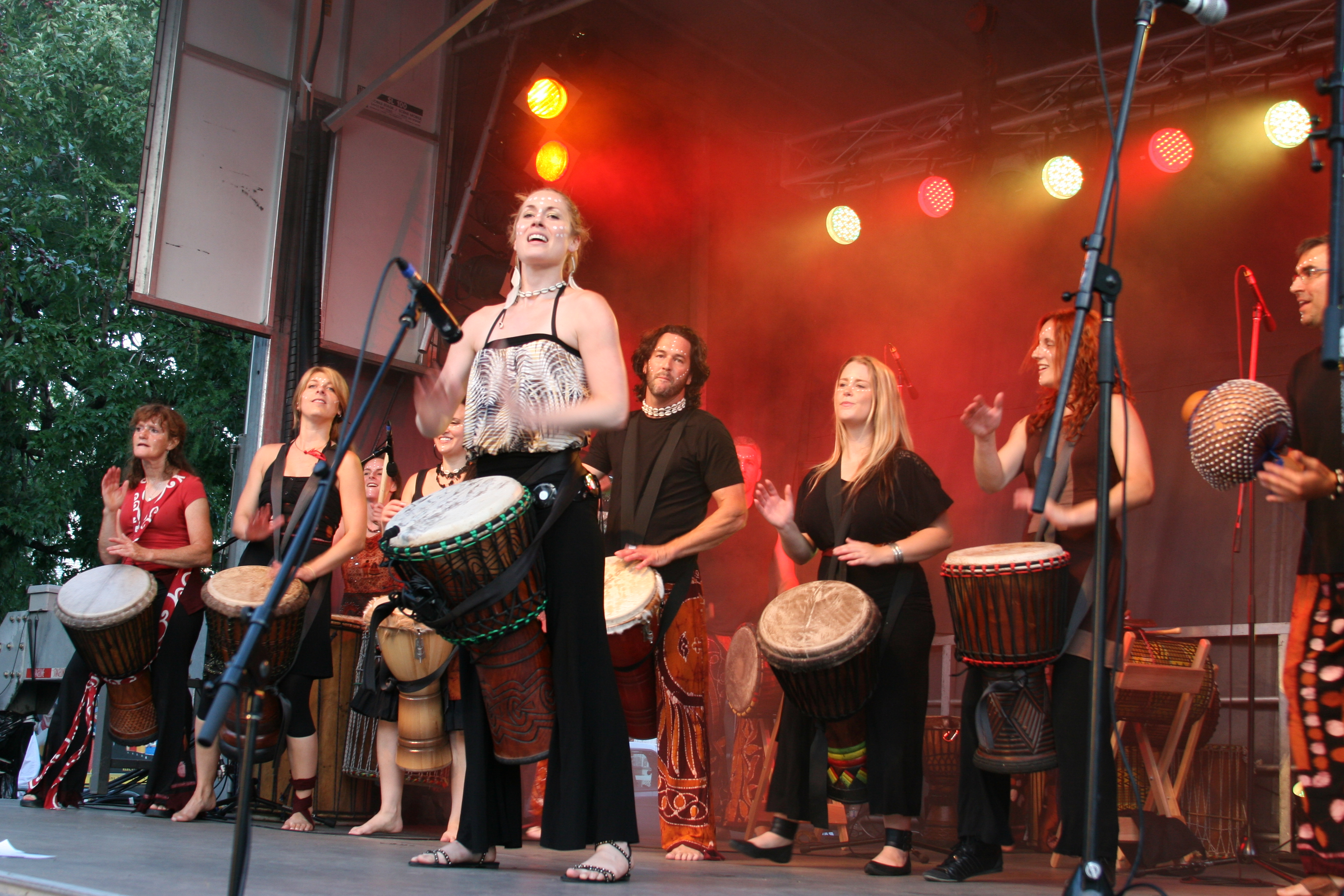
The Tam-Tams at the International Percussion Festival.

The International Percussion Festival (French: Festival international de percussions) is an annual festival of percussion instruments in Montreal, Quebec, Canada. The festival takes place on different places around Montreal each July over a period of six days . The festival is a nonprofit organization presenting over 500 local and international musicians, on 4 stages, attracting close to 200,000 spectators annually. The Percussion Festival has a different theme each year.

The festival was founded in 2002 by Gilbert Lucu and France Cadieux. The first festival was held in Venise-en-Québec near the United States border, although was moved to Longueuil starting in its second year. In 2015, the festival was at the Old Port of Montreal. In 2016, it will be in Verdun.
