= Festival des traditions du monde de Sherbrooke =

- Status: active
- Genre: festival
- Frequency: annually in mid-August
- Location: Quintal Park
- Coordinates: 45°25′52″N 71°51′15″W
- Country: Canada
- Inaugurated: 1998
- Participants: 700
- Major events: Music and danse performances; international cuisine; craft show; beer, cheese, and wine tastings; workshops; Irish pub; children's theatre & inflatable games
- Website: www.ftms.ca/en

The Festival des traditions du monde (World Traditions Festival) is an annual event in Sherbrooke, Quebec that celebrates various cultures from around the world. It has been hosted at the Quintal Park since its debut in 1998. It is open to the public at a small cost and is home to a variety of multicultural performances, food vendors, and artisans.
