= Sheelah's Day =

Cultural holiday celebrated on 18 March

Sheelah's Day / Lá Fhéile Síle
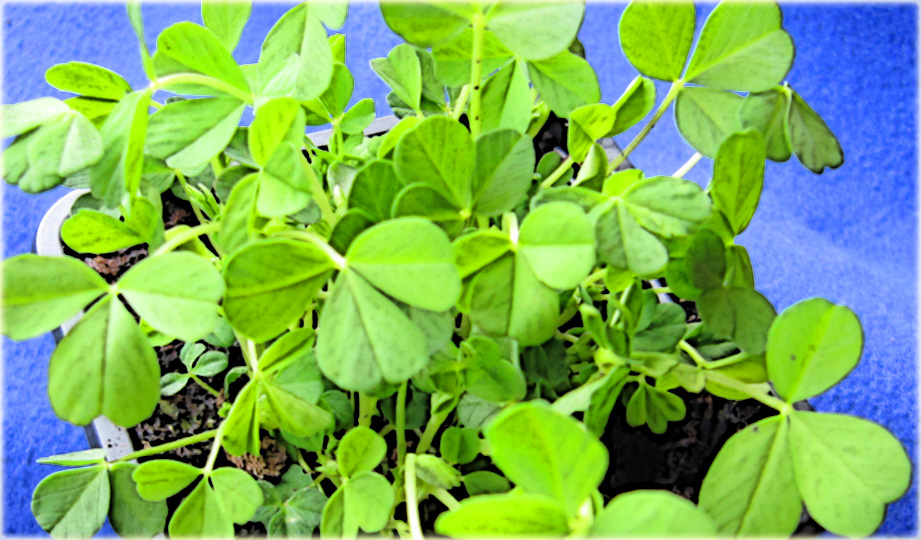
- Shamrocks are associated with Saint Patrick's Day and Sheelah's Day.
- Official name: St. Sheelah's Day / Lá 'le Síle
- Also called: Sheelagh's Day / Síle's Day
- Observed by: Irish people people of Irish descent Folk Catholicism
- Type: Ethnic, cultural
- Significance: Feast day commemorating the alleged wife of Saint Patrick
- Celebrations: wearing shamrocks; wearing green; drinking Irish beer; drinking Irish whiskey
- Date: 18 March
- Next time: 18 March 2026
- Frequency: Annual
- Related to: Saint Patrick's Day

Sheelah's Day, also known as Sheelagh's Day, (Ir. Lá 'le Síle) is an Irish cultural holiday celebrated on 18 March which coincides with Saint Patrick's Day. While the holiday is no longer widely celebrated in Ireland, there are still associated festivities celebrated throughout the Irish diaspora in Australia and Canada.

== History ==
Traditionally, Sheelah's Day (Lá 'le Síle) was celebrated the day after the Feast of Saint Patrick and coincided with the Christian festivities. According to Irish folklore and mythology, Sheelah / Síle (Old Ir. Sighile) was either the wife or mother of Saint Patrick, (Naomh Pádraig) and the holiday served to commemorate her life.

Irish antiquarian journals and newspapers from the eighteenth and nineteenth centuries mention a wife of Saint Patrick. Freeman's Journal referenced Sheelah's Day in 1785, 1811, and 1841. Australian press from the nineteenth century recorded observances of Sheelah's Day, including the consumption of large amounts of alcohol. Sheelah's Day is no longer officially celebrated in Ireland, but continues to be celebrated in Newfoundland, Canada after Irish immigrants arrived in the late seventeenth century.

In Newfoundland the holiday may also be connected to the legend of the Irish princess Sheila NaGeira.

Some scholars suggest a connection between the holiday and the Sheela na gig, found in medieval architecture throughout Europe.
