= Scarboro Fair =

Fair in present-day Toronto

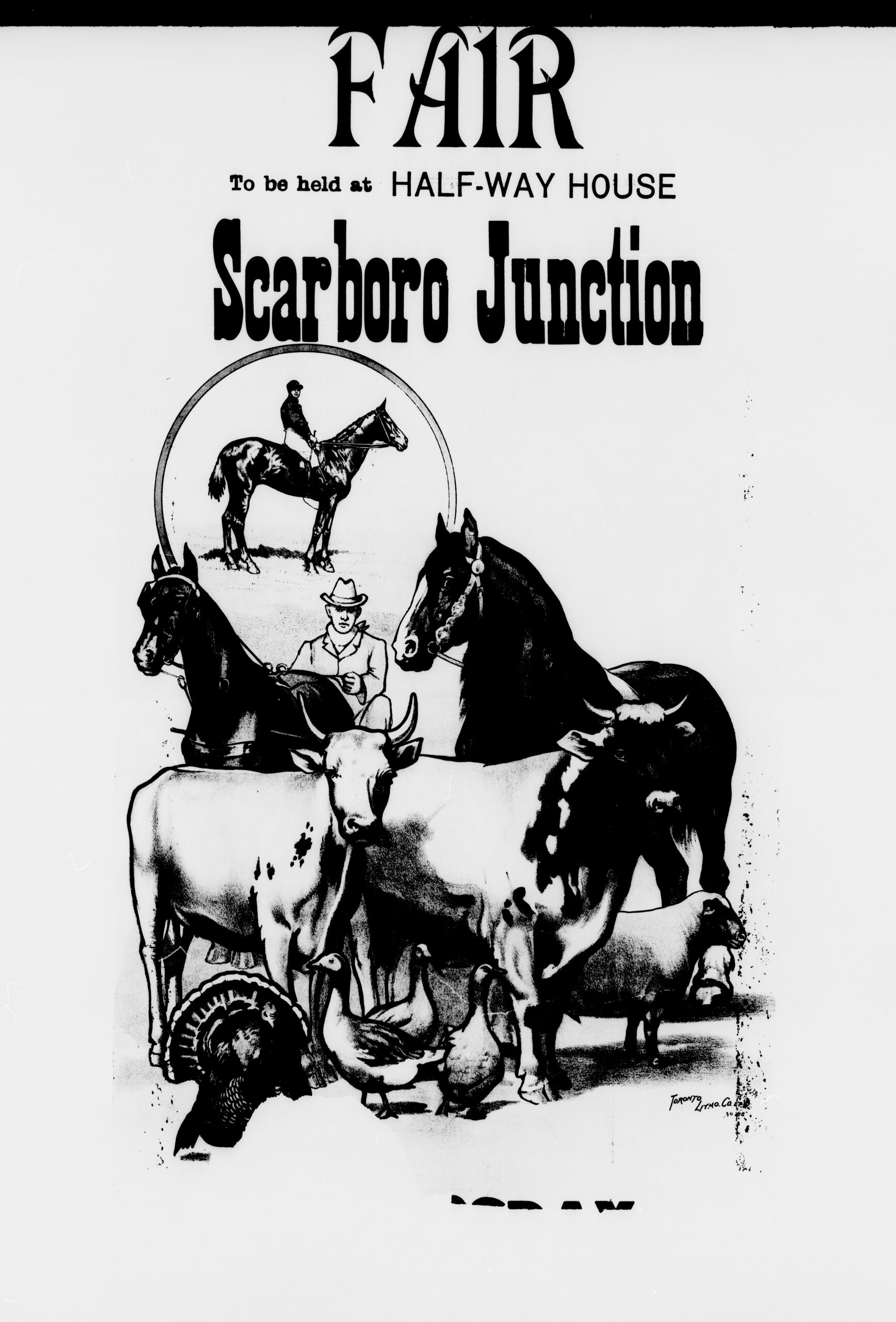
Advertisement for Scarboro Fair, to be held in Scarborough Junction, 1900.

The Scarboro Fair was an annual agricultural show that took place in Scarborough, Ontario, Canada—now part of Toronto—during the latter half of the 19th century and early 20th century.

== Background ==
During the years the fair was active, Scarborough (then spelled Scarboro) was a small agricultural community. As of 1900, its population was just over 3,700.

== History ==
The fair was hosted by the Scarborough Agricultural Society, founded on January 1, 1844.

The first fair was held on October 18, 1844 on the grounds of Joshua Sisley's Hotel, at Danforth Road and Eglinton Avenue. Sisley, apparently an agriculturalist himself, continued to host the fair in October in the years following; it later moved to taverns and hotels nearby. The last fair was held in 1936, likely in Agincourt.

The fair was evidently a rather substantial concern by the late 19th century. The 1895 fair, held in Woburn, distributed prizes totalling $1,110—over $29,063 today. (Note: Bank of Canada inflation data goes back only to 1914, so the true value is likely somewhat larger than that listed.)

A teenage commentator in the Farmer's Advocate, a London-based magazine that published until the mid-20th century, had this rather dismissive assessment of the 1911 fair:

It is only a small country fair, but it was largely attended this year, and there were nearly eight hundred people there. The grounds are nearly four miles east of Toronto. Big tents are used instead of buildings.

== Sources ==
- Boyle, David, ed. (1896). The Township of Scarboro, 1796–1896. Toronto: William Briggs.
