= List of blues festivals in Canada =

This is a list of blues festivals in Canada. These festivals—which celebrate Canadian blues music, and often times roots music as well—range from small, community-based festivals that feature mostly local performers, to major corporate-sponsored festivals that draw nationally and internationally-prominent blues musicians.

Some of the larger festivals in Canada include the Ottawa Bluesfest, Bluesfest Windsor, the Harvest Jazz & Blues Festival in Fredericton, Tremblant International Blues Festival in Mont-Tremblant, and the Edmonton's Labatt Blues Festival. These festivals, which are usually organized by volunteer-based blues societies, are an important part of the Canadian blues scene.

== List ==
=== British Columbia ===
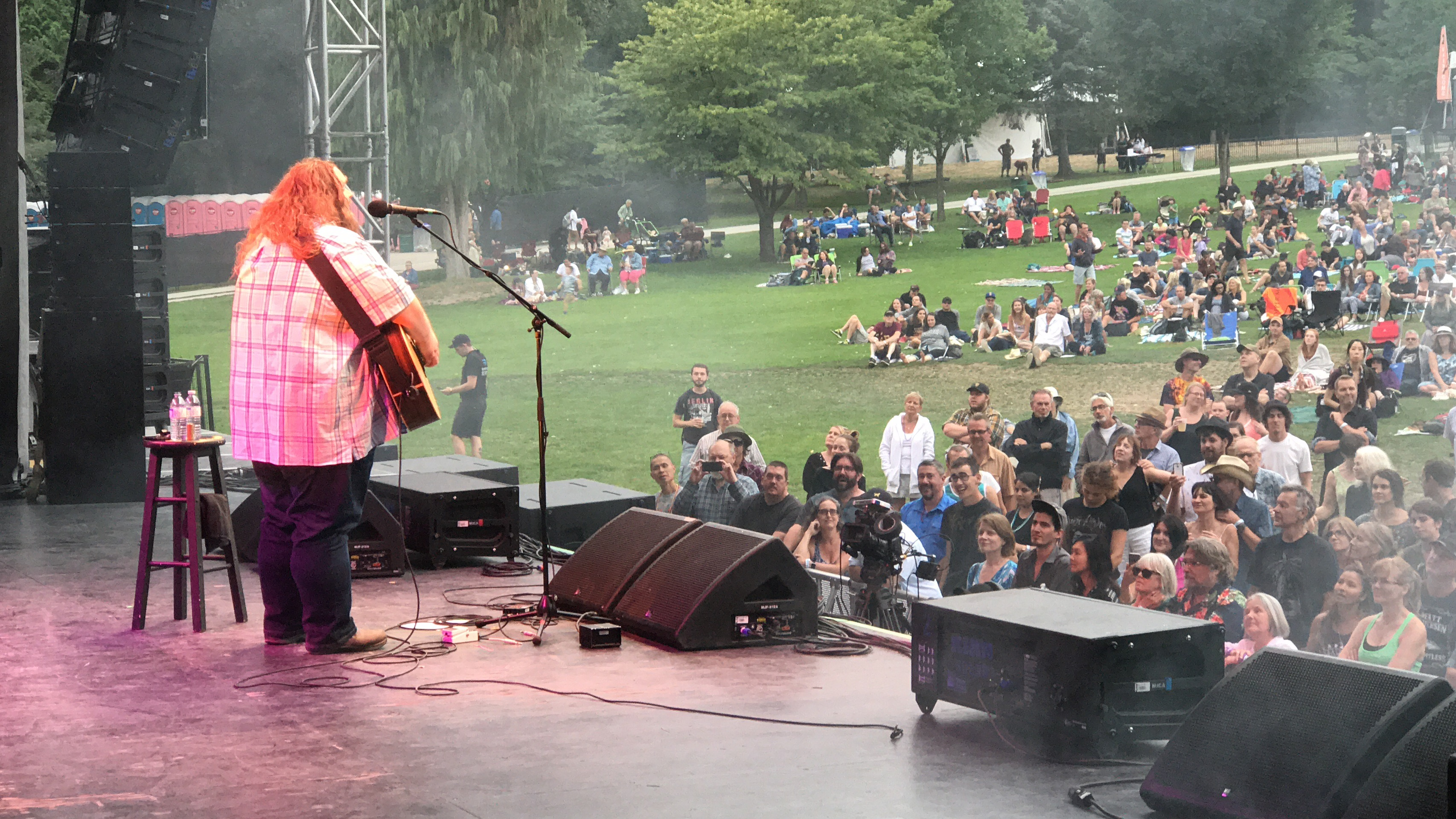
Matt Andersen entertaining the Burnaby Blues and Roots Festival

- Burnaby Blues + Roots Festival — August in Burnaby
- Harbour Blues 'N Roots Festival (formerly Vancouver Island Blues Bash) — Labour Day weekend in Victoria
- Hornby Island Blues Workshop — May in Hornby Island
- Pender Harbour Blues Festival — early June in Pender Harbour
- Salmon Arm Roots and Blues Festival — August in Salmon Arm, in B.C. Interior
- Summertime Blues Festival — August in Nanaimo

=== Alberta ===
- Beaumont Blues & Roots Festival — June (previously Labour Day weekend) in Beaumont
- Calgary International Blues Festival — summer in Calgary
  - Calgary Midwinter Bluesfest — February in Calgary

=== Saskatchewan ===
- Regina Blues Association’s Mid-Winter Blues Festival — in Regina
- Saskatoon Blues Festival — end of February in Saskatchewan

=== Manitoba ===
- Great Woods Music Festival — August in Beausejour
- Winnipeg BBQ & Blues Festival — August in Winnipeg

=== Ontario ===
- Aurora Winter Blues Festival — in Aurora
- Barrie Jazz and Blues Festival — June (2nd weekend) in Barrie
  - The February Blues — February in Barrie
- Bluesfest International — July in Windsor and London
- Bluesfest Windsor — July in Windsor
- Boon's House Blues & Roots Festival — July in Hamilton
- Burlington Jazz & Blues Festival — July in Burlington
- Canal Bank Shuffle — October in Thorold
- Capitol Centre's Bluesfest — in North Bay
- Coal Flats Blues Festival — September in Port Burwell
- Escarpment Blues Festival — mid-July in Milton
- Kitchener Blues Festival — August in Kitchener

Lighthouse Blues Festival - Kincardine - July www.lighthousebluesfestival.com

- Limestone City Blues Festival — late August in Kingston
- London Blues Festival — August in London
- Mudcat Blues Fest — August in Dunnville
- Orangeville Blues and Jazz Festival — first weekend of June in Orangeville
- Orillia Spring Blues Festival — Orillia
- Oshawa Jazz and Blues Festival — August in Oshawa
- Ottawa Bluesfest — July in Ottawa
- Paisley Blues Fest — June (1st weekend) in Paisley, Ontario
- Porquis Blues Festival — early July in Porquis
- Port Credit Blues and Jazz Festival (also called the "Southside Shuffle") — early September in Port Credit, Mississauga
- Stratford Blues and Ribfest — June in Stratford
- Thunder Bay Blues Festival — July in Thunder Bay
- Toronto BluesFest — June in Toronto
- Twisted Pines Blues Festival — May in the Midland/Penetanguishene area
- Wasaga Beach Blues — September in Wasaga Beach
- Winterfolk Blues & Roots Festival — in Toronto
- Women in the Wilds Blues Festival — September in Atikokan, Northwestern Ontario

=== Quebec ===
- Festival de Jazz et Blues de Saguenay — April in Chicoutimi
- West Island Blues Festival — June in Pierrefonds/Roxboro, Island of Montreal
- Montreal International Jazz Festival (Blues Stage) — June in Montreal
- Tremblant International Blues Festival — July in Mont-Tremblant
- Sherblues & Folk — July in Sherbrooke
- l'Ile en Blues — August in Saint-Laurent-de-l'Île-d'Orléans
- Les Nuits Blues Laurentides — August in Saint-Sauveur
- Festival de Blues de Donnacona — August in Donnacona
- Trois-Rivières en Blues — August in Trois-Rivières
- Festival de Blues de Joliette — October in Joliette

=== Atlantic Canada ===
- Dutch Mason Blues Festival — August in Truro, Nova Scotia
- Harvest Jazz & Blues Festival — September in Fredericton, New Brunswick
- Wreckhouse International Jazz & Blues Festival — early July in St. John's, Newfoundland and Labrador
- Blues d'la Baie — July (3rd weekend) in Petit-Rocher, New Brunswick
