= Mondial des Cultures =

Coordinates: 45.8864°N 72.4871°W

The Mondial Des Cultures (formerly called the Festival Mondial de Folklore (World Folklore Festival) was a folk dance festival which was held every summer in early July at the Woodyatt Park, in Drummondville, a city located in the Centre-du-Québec region. The event was founded in 1982, after members of the folk ensemble Mackinaw had attended a similar festival in Dijon, France. The last festival was held in summer 2017 festival, after which it ceased to exist.

During the eleven days of celebration, dozens of renowned artists and folk ensembles from around the world participated in this event which attracted in its last years an average of over 300,000 visits per year. The annual budget was 2.2 million Canadian dollars and the economic benefits were estimated at 16.7 million Canadian dollars, according to a study conducted by the survey firm CROP in 2007. Such statistics made the Mondial des Cultures one of the four largest folk festivals in the world. It was also one of the figureheads of the Canadian Section of the CIOFF (International Organization of Folklore Festival and Traditional Arts), an organization in formal consultative relations with UNESCO.

== Mission ==
The Mondial des Cultures aimed to hold a high quality festival for spectators that are eager to discover cultures of the world while respecting its mission to:

"Develop and hold an international cultural event which displays the facets of various traditions of the world in a festival for the whole family where a brotherhood and universal spirit of peace prevails."

== History ==
The very first edition of the Mondial des Cultures was founded in July 1982 thanks to the support of the Canadian Council of Folk Art (Conseil Canadien des arts populaires) and the Carrefour socio-culturel of Drummondville. The spontaneous support of the local population made the success of the event instantaneous and the festival rapidly became a reference in the Québec Folklore, in North America and around the world.

Twenty-seven years later, some 90 countries have been represented through dance and music performed by more than 430 different artistic groups. In 1998, a shift began with the change of name, to upgrade the image of the event and also to expand the programming, and focus more and more on the younger public and families. Immersed in an ocean of summer festivals and attractions of all kinds, the Mondial des Cultures has managed to distinguish itself by its content and its product. Member of RÉMI (Regroupement des événements majeurs internationaux du Québec) since 1999, the organization played a key role in the biggest events in Québec.

== The sites of the Mondial des Cultures ==
The Woodyatt Park, located in the heart of the City of Drummondville, is the historic place where all the festivities took place each summer. The variety of scheduled activities during the Mondial des Cultures all took place here.

- The Grande Place SAQ: the main stage offered grand scale entertainment. It could accommodate more than 3,500 persons seated and 6,000 standing. Some thirty major productions took place at the Grande Place SAQ.
- The Folkothèque Bluberi: 800 people were invited under a huge tent to join in an intimate encounter with folk dancers and musicians. Spectators were also invited to do a few dance steps with the performers. Over 55 interactive performances were held here through the 11-day festival.
- The Pavillon des Cultures Loto-Québec was place where visitors could discover the customs and traditions, games, tasting of typical dishes, all this enticing the five senses. Visitors could participate to one of the 75 scheduled activities.
- The Youth Area Hydro-Québec: especially designed for children 2 to 12 years old. This area provided games, makeup, tinkering, and board games. In addition, some twenty performances featuring the folk ensembles especially designed for the young ones took place during the festival.
- Flavor’s All

== The artists ==
As of 2009, 92 countries had been represented at the Mondial des Cultures with over 430 dance artistic groups and 25,000 artists. Several major artists performed on center stage such as Corneille, Zachary Richard, la Compagnie Créole or Grégory Charles.
