= Harvest Jazz & Blues Festival =

Canadian annual music festival

Harvest Music Festival
- Genre: Blues, jazz, world music
- Dates: September
- Locations: Fredericton, New Brunswick; Canada
- Years active: 1991 – present
- Website: https://harvestmusicfest.ca

The Harvest Music Festival (formerly known as the Harvest Jazz & Blues Festival) is an annual music festival held each September in downtown Fredericton, New Brunswick, that features blues, jazz and world music.

The first festival in 1991 was held over four days in various existing venues around the downtown, including the inside of the Boyce Farmer's Market. In 2000, part of Queen Street was closed to traffic during the festival, a practice continued to the present day. Today, the festival includes dozens of acts spread out over 6 days. Venues include four dedicated tents, five outdoor "FreeHarvest" venues and 11 official pubs and clubs. It is the largest music event in the city.

In 2021 the festival announced they would be changing their name to "Harvest Music Festival" to better showcase a broader festival still grounded in blues, roots, rock, Americana and more.

== See also ==
- List of blues festivals
- List of folk festivals
- List of jazz festivals
