= Festival of Northern Lights =

Christmas light display in Owen Sound, Ontario, Canada

The Festival of Northern Lights is a large award-winning display of Christmas lights in Owen Sound, Ontario, Canada. The celebration runs from mid November into January and it attracts 20,000 people each year. The Festival is a brainchild of Marie Walpole in 1987.

Approximately 25 kilometers of light strings and 400 lighted designs are displayed at the harbour, along the Sydenham River's course through town, on city streets and in parks like Harrison Park. It has been named one of the top 100 festivals in Ontario for 2009 by Festivals and Events Ontario, an industry organization.

In its 21st year in 2008 it was gradually converted to LED lights from traditional incandescent lights out of respect for the environment. This effort aimed to reduce operating costs allowing the festival operators to expand the magnitude of the festival. Because it can be viewed while driving, the annual display was erected in 2020, early in the COVID-19 pandemic. The following year communities were allowed to decide to hold public events or not and Owen Sound held its customary opening Santa Claus parade.

Parents who viewed the displays as children bring their own offspring to view them.
