= Carassauga =

Annual multicultural festival in Mississauga, Ontario, Canada

Carassauga is an annual multicultural festival in Mississauga, Ontario. Carassauga is a three-day event occurring annually in May.

Funded in 1985, Carassauga features cultural pavilions representing different countries and cultures.

== History ==
Carassauga is an incorporated non-profit volunteer community organization. The festival was developed in response to a challenge from former Mayor Hazel McCallion in 1985. Carassauga is meant to reflect the ethnic and racial diversity of Mississauga

== Pavilions ==
The Carassauga Cultural Pavilions are located in cultural and recreation centres throughout Mississauga.

Each pavilion provide food, entertainment, art, historical displays and vendors that represent a different culture. Performances at the pavilions may include dance, music, singing, fashion shows, and plays. The pavilions also offer dance lessons, arts and crafts, and cooking demos.
