= Algoma Fall Festival =

Canadian arts festival

Coordinates: 46°30′32″N 84°19′35.5″W

The Algoma Fall Festival is an annual arts festival, usually held in October, in Sault Ste. Marie, Ontario, Canada. The Algoma Arts Festival Association was incorporated in 1972 and the first festival was held in 1973. The festival was established to help promote the performing and visual arts, as well as increase tourism and entertain area residents. The festival has hosted various local, Canadian, and internationally renowned performers, such as: Wynton Marsalis, Canadian Brass, Emily Carr, Adrienne Clarkson, Dizzy Gillespie, Marcel Marceau, Stephan Grappelli, the Royal Shakespeare Company, Sharon Lois and Bram, and others.
