= Toronto Chinese Lantern Festival =

Festival in Toronto, Canada

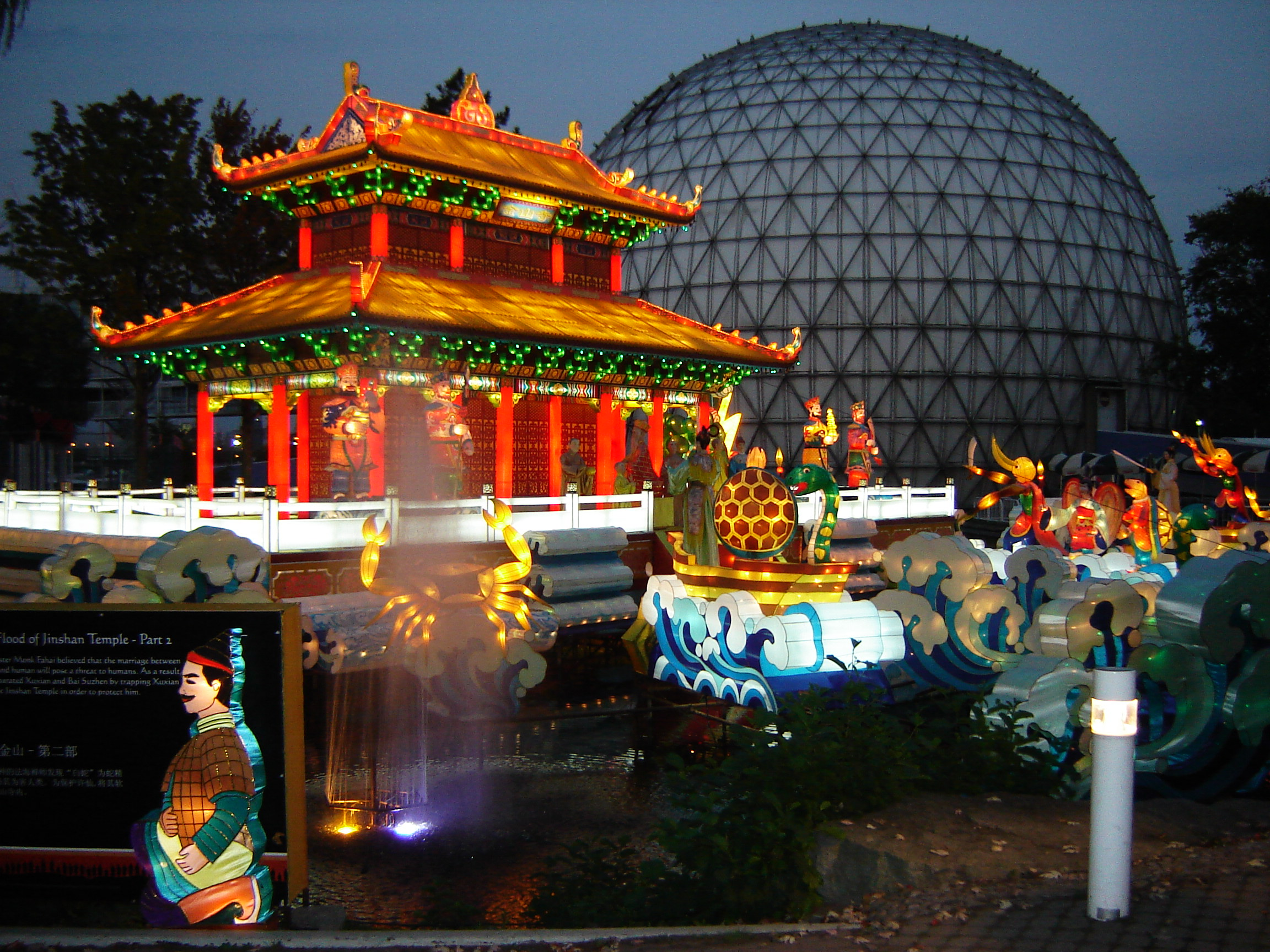
One of the Lanterns from the 2007 Toronto Chinese Lantern Festival

The Toronto Chinese Lantern Festival was a festival held at Ontario Place in Toronto, Ontario, Canada. Sponsored by the Rogers Media Group, the festival is the largest lantern festival held outside Asia. The lanterns - large illuminated and often animated displays made with steel frameworks covered in paper and plastics - can be as high as 50 feet and as long as 300 feet.

The Toronto event is based on the historical Chinese Lantern Festival, held in China on the fifteenth and final day of the Lunar New Year celebration. According to legend, a maid the Imperial Palace named Yuanxiao wanted to be home with her family for the Lunar New Year. She told the emperor that the God of Fire visited her and told her that he planned to burn down the city. She suggested that the emperor should make the city look like it was already burning so the God of Fire wouldn't bother them. The emperor thus had the entire court and city put up colored lanterns and light firecrackers to mimic a great fire. In the confusion, Yuanxiao was able to sneak home.

The 2007 festival in Toronto was held from July 19 to October 7, featuring 40 displays which focused on three major Chinese dynasties: the Qin, Tang, and Song. Artisans from China came to construct the displays. The Festival was held at Ontario Place, on the waterfront in Toronto, near the Canadian National Exhibition grounds. Originally envisioned as a one-year event, the success of its first year resulted in the festival returning in the summer and fall of 2008 and 2009.
