= Brighton Applefest =

Food festival in Ontario, Canada

Coordinates: 44°02′32″N 77°44′13″W

- Date: Last full weekend of September
- Frequency: Annual
- Locations: Brighton, Ontario, Canada
- Years active: 51–52
- Attendance: 20,000
- Organiser: Municipality of Brighton
- Website: www.brighton.ca/en/discover-brighton/applefest.aspx

The Brighton Applefest was created in 1975 by the merchants of Brighton, Ontario, Canada to promote the Brighton area, and the apple-based culture around it.

In 2020 and 2021, the festival was cancelled due to COVID-19. It returned in 2022.

It is now Brighton's largest yearly event, taking place annually during the last full week of September. Applefest can draw up to 30,000 visitors with at least 20,000 visitors.

The festival offers a variety of attractions. Its primary draw is its parade, and a street festival featuring fresh foods and local crafts. Other attractions include hayrides, a classic car show, live music, Kinsmen pancake breakfast, a firework show, and a children's amusement park. Vendors can be found around town selling local arts and crafts.

Helicopter rides of Brighton are offered on Friday, Saturday and Sunday. Shuttle bus service has been offered due to congestion and lack of parking.
