= Northern Saskatchewan International Children's Festival =

- Genre: music, theatre, puppetry, comedy, face painting, singing, parades
- Dates: early June
- Locations: Saskatoon, Saskatchewan; Canada
- Years active: 1989 – present

Northern Saskatchewan International Children's Festival is held in early June on the shore of the South Saskatchewan River in Kiwanis Park, downtown, Saskatoon. Talented children's performers from around the world are mainstage at this event such as Al Simmons, Pied Pumpkin, Michel Lauziere, Sharon Hampson and Bram Morrison. Across Canada there are similar festivals such as those nearby namely the Winnipeg International Children's Festival, Regina International Children's, Northern Alberta Int'l Children's Festival, Calgary Int'l Children's Festival. Tickets are purchased for the mainstage events. The festival provides crafts, parades, face painting and many other varied site activities in the park for festival attendees. The festival is staffed and run primarily by volunteers, and funded by community sponsors.
