= The Word on the Street (literary festival) =

Canadian literary festival

The Word on the Street is a Canadian book and magazine festival held each September in Toronto, Kitchener, Lethbridge, Saskatoon, and Halifax.

Each city's festival features author readings, workshops, information booths, marketplace, and reading- and writing-related activities. The mandate of the organization is "to unite the country in a national, annual celebration of reading and writing and to highlight the importance of literacy in the lives of all Canadians."

Over the years, it has attracted numerous Canadian authors for author readings, such as Margaret Atwood, Pierre Berton, Arthur Black, Joy Fielding, Timothy Findley, Dennis Lee, Robert Munsch, Paul Quarrington, Michael Redhill, and David Suzuki.

In September 2012, the six single-day regional events welcomed more than 250,000 visitors and offered more than 400 programmed events featuring 585 authors, workshop presenters, and arts performers. The festival also showcased more than 500 book and magazine exhibitors promoting mostly Canadian works.

== Founding organizations ==
Founding organizations include:

- Book and Periodical Council
- Canadian Give The Gift of Literacy Foundation
- Canadian Authors Association
- Canadian Book Information Centre
- Canadian Book Publishers Council
- Canadian Booksellers Associations
- Canadian Children’s Book Centre
- Freelance Editors Association of Canada
- Canadian Library Association
- Canadian Magazine Publishing Association
- League of Canadian Poets
- Literary Presses Group
- Ontario Literacy Coalition
- Professional Writers Association of Canada
- Playwright’s Union of Canada
- Writer's Union of Canada

== Locations ==
The Word on the Street was first held in Toronto in 1990. Until 2003, the festival was on a section of Queen Street West in downtown Toronto. In 2004, the festival moved to Queen's Park, where it was held until moving to Harbourfront Centre in 2015. In 2020 and 2021 the festival took place online due to the COVID-19 pandemic. It returned as an in-person event in June 2022. In 2025 it took place at David Pecaut Square.

The Word on the Street's Halifax event, first held in 1995, took place at the Cunard Event Centre on the Halifax waterfront. The 25th Halifax festival occurred in 2019. After ceasing operations due to the COVID-19 pandemic it was succeeded by an event called "Word on the Hill" which was organized by Nimbus Publishing.

The Word on the Street Vancouver event, also first held in 1995, took place at Library Square. 2012 was the final year of this city's participation as a Word on the Street festival. It has been re-branded as WORD Vancouver.

The Word on the Street Kitchener event was first held in 2002 and takes place in the city's Victoria Park.

In 2007, the board of the Calgary event announced that it would not be held in 2008 for logistical reasons.

The Word on the Street Lethbridge began in 2011 and happens in the street surrounding the Lethbridge Public Library.

The first full-fledged Word on the Street Saskatoon was held in 2011 in and around the Frances Morrison Library.
