= Brampton Fall Fair =

Coordinates: 43.769900°N 79.829391°W

- Genre: Fall Fair
- Dates: End of September
- Locations: 12942 Heart Lake Road, Caledon, Ontario
- Years active: 168
- Founded: 1852
- Website: Official website

The Brampton Fall Fair is an annual agricultural and entertainment event in Brampton, Ontario. It features agricultural displays, animals, 4H events, a midway, entertainment, demolition derby, and a Homecraft exhibit.

== History ==
The first Brampton Fall Fair was held in 1853. During the early 1830s, farmers from the 212 farms of Chinguacousy Township gathered at Martin Salisbury's Tavern for biannual fairs.

As the Industrial Revolution and other influences changed society, agriculture transformed from a subsistence process to a commercial industry, a change that was followed by an increase in demand for equipment, supplies, and power. The government created an act in 1853 to enable and assist counties in forming agricultural boards. The resulting government-funded organization was the County of Peel Agricultural Society.

In 1853, a small agricultural fair was set up by the organization and held to the west of Main and Queen Streets, near the current location of Brampton City Hall.

The event was modest overall. Prized horses and cattle were showcased, and whole grains, root vegetables, dairy and other produce were displayed for sale. One could suggest this was the precursor of today's Brampton Farmers' Market. This agricultural fair eventually became the modern Brampton Fall Fair.

The original fairgrounds spanned seven acres (28328.00m²) and were located at Wellington and Main Street. The land was purchased in 1871 for $1235. This property was eventually sold to make way for the County Jail and Courthouse. The Peel Heritage Complex museum and art gallery now occupy the property. In 1884, the fairgrounds were relocated to thirteen acres {52609m²} of land on Elliot Street. According to Brampton: An Illustrated History, the land from the Elliot Street location was sold to the Agricultural Society by William McConnell, owner of the Brampton Driving Park.

Once a highlight for farmers, draft horse competitions were replaced in the 1920s by tractor demonstrations. Still, many of the Fair's displayed picks for top riding horses went on to win at the Canadian National Exhibition and Royal Agricultural Winter Fair.

The Junior Farmers' Building and the Memorial Arena were erected on the Brampton Fall Fair Elliot Street grounds in 1950, and the Brampton Curling Club was constructed in 1951. Because of its unique all-wood roof structure, Memorial Arena has recently been used for a Tim Hortons ad. The Canadian curling-themed feature film Men with Brooms (2002), starring Paul Gross and Leslie Nielsen, was partially filmed at the Memorial and the Brampton Curling Club. A lacrosse box was added to the ground in 1971.

Most residents associate the Brampton Fall Fair with midway rides and games more than agriculture and handicrafts. This association began in 1975, with the addition of Campbell Amusements. The 1980s brought antique car shows to the fair, and the 1990s brought the demolition derbies.

== Present ==
The Brampton Fair Grounds (Now Old Fairgrounds Park) were sold to the City of Brampton in March 1992, with the exception of the Brampton Curling Club properties.

In 1995, the Region of Peel Agricultural Society bought 95.43 acres (386,200 m^{2}) of land at Heart Lake Road and Old School Road in Caledon, moving the fair to that location in September 1997 for its 144th season.

The new location includes the Peel Junior Farmers Hall (6,000 sq. ft.), meeting rooms, the Show and Sale Pavilion (33,000 sq. ft.), ten multi-purpose buildings, and outdoor show rings.

The Fall Fair's Homecraft Division, consists of arts & crafts, photography, handicrafts, needlework, baking and kitchen craft, gardening and flowers, fruits and vegetables, quilting, arrangements, and antiques. Many of these categories have both junior and adult versions. Special categories for developmentally challenged students have been introduced recently to the fair.

There was no Fall Fair in 2020.

== Fairgrounds ==
There are four permanent structures on the fairgrounds:

- Main Fair Entrance, Fair Offices and Junior Farmer Hall
- Agricultural Display Building
- Livestock Show and Sales Building
- Multi-Purpose Building

== Highlights ==
165th
September 15 - 16, 2018
Theme: Into the Garden

== Presidents ==
- 1853 Peleg Howland
- 1854 R.C. Smith
- 1855-57 John Vodden
- 1858 John Tilt
- 1859-60 James Patterson
- 1861-63 John Tilt
- 1864-65 R.A. Hartley
- 1866-67 Emerson Taylor
- 1868-69 M. Perdue
- 1870-72 J.P. Hutton
- 1873 Wm. Elliott
- 1874-75 John C. Spell
- 1876-78 Rich Hamilton
- 1879-80 James Jackson
- 1881 John Smith
- 1882-85 George Cheyne
- 1886-88 J.P. Hutton
- 1889-90 A.F. Campbell
- 1890-91 S.J. Person
- 1892 John Smith
- 1893-94 J.J. Stewart
- 1895-98 Robt. Crawford
- 1899-1900 J.H. Watson
- 1901-02 W.H. Rutledge
- 1903-04 Dr. J.F. Quin
- 1905-06 H.C.Clarridge
- 1907-08 J.D. Orr
- 1909-10 H.A. Dolson
- 1911-12 F.J. Jackson
- 1913 J.R. Cole & L.J.C. Bull
- 1914 L.J.C. Bull
- 1915-16 Darius McClure
- 1917-18 Jas. Laidlaw
- 1919-20 Albert Hewson
- 1921-22 W.B. McCullock
- 1923-24 W.J. Hunter
- 1925-26 Dr. F. Hutchinson
- 1927-28 Thos. Dolson
- 1929-30 James Tilt
- 1931-32 Frank Fenwick
- 1933-34 W. Gladstone Shaw
- 1935-36 W.L. Wilkinson
- 1936-37 J.W. Crashley
- 1937-38 Alex McKinney, Jr.
- 1939-40 Wm. Bovaird
- 1941 Charles R. Fendley
- 1942 Charles London
- 1943 Haddon Pegg
- 1944-45 J.M. Fraser
- 1946 Douglas S. Dunton
- 1947-49 J.N. Duncan
- 1950-51 Oscar Graham
- 1952-53 J.W. Wiggins
- 1954-55 Fred Gowland
- 1956 C.M. Hutton
- 1957-59 J.M. Brownridge
- 1960-61 J.J. Shaw
- 1962-63 L.R. Livingston
- 1964-65 John H. McCulloch
- 1966-67 Allen A. Andrews
- 1968-69 Richard House
- 1970-71 Donald A. Garbutt
- 1972-73 Wm. Brander
- 1974-75 Jack Klassen
- 1976-77 Wm. Taylor
- 1978-79 John M. McClure
- 1980-81 J. Albert Dunn
- 1982-83 David M. Julian
- 1984-85 John Johnson
- 1986-87 Jean House
- 1988 Ross Milne
- 1989-90 Fred Kee
- 1991-92 Joanne Currie
- 1993-95 Wm. R. Richardson
- 1996-97 Ken Williamson
- 1998-99 Trevor Small
- 2000-01 Peter Armstrong
- 2002-03 Bill Jackson
- 2004-05 Tereska Matthews
- 2005-06
- 2006-07
- 2007-08
- 2008-09
- 2017 Al Woolley
- 2018 Bill Morrison
- 2019 Allan Wrigglesworth
- 2022 Erin Ziegler
- 2025 Donald Neelands

== Secretaries of the fair ==
Despite the job title, the position is equivalent to a manager.

- 1857-70 John Lynch
- 1871 A.B. Scott
- 1872-74 D.L. Scott
- 1875 J.P. Clark
- 1876-85 A. Armour
- 1886-1901 Henry Roberts
- 1902-10 John Cooney
- 1911-16 Miss. M.M. Kirkwood
- 1917-23 John H. Watson
- 1924-25 Robt. McCullock
- 1926-35 T.W. Thomson
- 1936 Frank Kitto, Wilma Snyder, Assistant
- 1937 D.E. Smith
- 1938-44 Fred McBride
- 1945-69 H.J. Laidlaw
- 1970-76 Robert J. Shaw
- 1977-82 Jack Klassen
- 1983 Pam Gillette
- 1983-84 Leona Allen
- 1985-88 Diane Irwin
- 1988-89 Norma Reinhart
- 1989-90 Vern Breen
- 1990-96 Ken Ewan, Brenda Bebbington, Assistant
- 1997-2018 Brenda Bebbington
- 2022-Present Sam Catalfamo

== See also ==
Other Canadian annual fairs

- Canadian National Exhibition - Toronto
- Calgary Stampede - Calgary
- Edmonton K-Days - Edmonton
- Pacific National Exhibition - Vancouver
- Central Canada Exhibition - Ottawa
- Canadian Lakehead Exhibition - Thunder Bay
- Markham Fair - Markham, Ontario
- Red River Exhibition - Winnipeg
- Royal Agricultural Winter Fair - Toronto
- Royal Manitoba Winter Fair - Brandon, Manitoba
- Schomberg Fair - Schomberg, Ontario
- Sooke Fall Fair - Sooke, British Columbia
- Streetsville Bread and Honey Festival - Mississauga
- Western Fair - London, Ontario
