= Provincial Agricultural Fair of Canada West =

Annual event in Canada

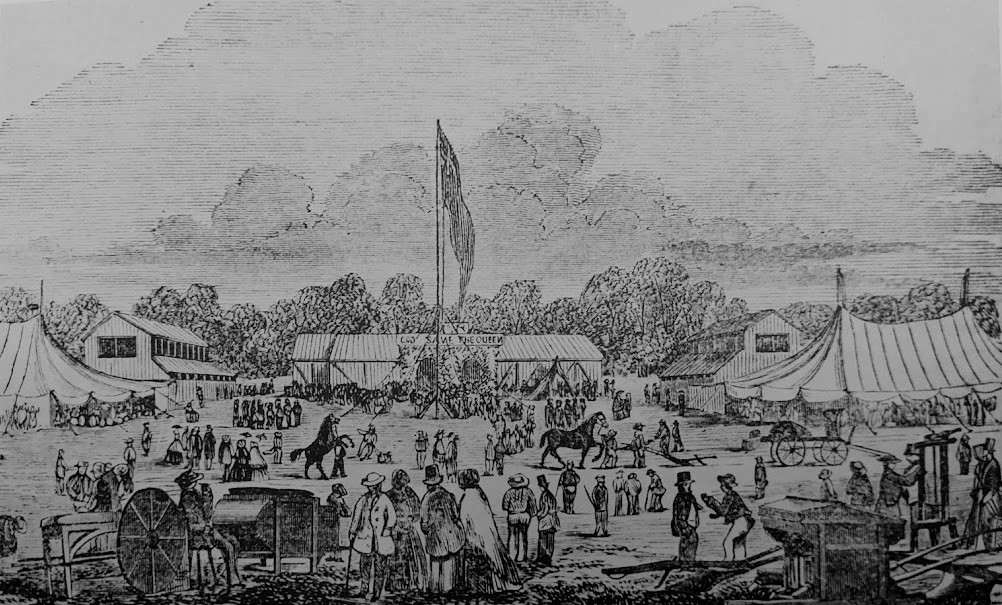
View of 1852 Canada West Agricultural Fair in Toronto

The Provincial Agricultural Fair of Canada West was an annual provincial agricultural fair held in various places in Canada West and after 1867 in Ontario.

The fair was established in 1846 and sponsored by the Provincial Agricultural Association and the Board of Agriculture for Canada West. It replaced an earlier attempt in 1792 by the Agricultural Society of Upper Canada founded in Newark (now Niagara-on-the-Lake, Ontario) in 1792.

The fair was mainly an agricultural themed show featuring horses and domesticated animals from around what was still a very rural pre-Confederation Ontario. It would last until 1878 as it met competition with large number of local fairs that emerged across some towns and counties in Ontario and eventually succeeded by the Canadian National Exhibition in 1879.

== List of Provincial Agricultural Association of Canada West/Ontario ==
Year	Host	Notes
1846	Toronto	Held at Government House Grounds near King Street West and Simcoe Street. The value of prizes was $1,600. The number of entries was 1,150.
1847	Hamilton	Used Old Race Grounds between Dundurn Street (then Garth Street) and Locke Street South along Aberdeen Avenue in Kirkendall area. The value of prizes was $3,000. The number of entries was 1,600.
1848	Cobourg	Hosted by Northumberland Agricultural Society and held on land loan by Patrick Wallace in the west end of town. The value of prizes was $3,100. The number of entries was 1,500.
1849	Kingston	Likely on same site used the then Frontenac Agricultural Society Fair c. 1825 near Kingston (Kingston and District Agricultural Society after 1825). The value of prizes was $5,100. The number of entries was 1,429.
1850	Niagara (Niagara-on-the-Lake)	Held at Court House (now Old Court House Theatre) and 14 acres of land set aside (perhaps military reserves). The value of prizes was $5,000. The number of entries was 1,638.
1851	Brockville	Host of fair from September 24 to 26. The value of prizes was $5,000. The number of entries was 1,466.
1852	Toronto	September 21 to September 24. North part of Grange Park (neighbourhood). The value of prizes was $6,000. The number of entries was 3,048.
1853	Hamilton	October 4 to 7. The value of prizes was $6,400. The number of entries was 2,820.
1854	London, Ontario	September 24 to 26. The first year London was chosen as a host site, corresponding to London's celebration of the coming of the railroad. Fair site was north of Oxford St., and south of Grosvenor St., between Talbot St. and the Thames River (now London Life Recreation Grounds). Attended in last three days by James Bruce, 8th Earl of Elgin. On the opening day, approximately 30,000 people attended. The value of prizes was $7,200. The number of entries was 2,933. The floral hall hosted the first recorded public art show in London. A contemporary account notes the large size of the agricultural show, and the almost complete absence of exhibits highlighting mining and quarrying, forestry, and the Great Lakes fishery.
1855	Cobourg	October 9 to 12
1856	Kingston	September 23 to 26
1857	Brantford, Ontario	Held September 29 to 30

From 1858 the fair rotated between Toronto, Kingston, Hamilton and London in the same sequence for the duration of the fair's existence.

Year	Host	Notes
1858	Toronto	Crystal Palace or Palace of Industry built near King Street West and Shaw Street
1859	Kingston	Held again in the city for third time.
1860	Hamilton	
1861	London	Military Garrison property near Victoria Park. The second provincial fair held in London (and sixteenth in Canada West) was on September 24–27, 1861, on grounds between Waterloo and Richmond, running south of what would become Kenneth Avenue "nearly down to Central Avenue". Octagonal Crystal Palace for the fair opens September 10, 1861 (demolished May 1888), designed by William Robinson, and built for $9000, sited immediately south of Great Market Street (now Central Ave) between Waterloo and Richmond.
1862	Toronto	September 23 to 26
1863	Kingston	
1864	Hamilton	
1865	London	Military Garrison property near Victoria Park. Held September 18–22, this was the fair's third time in London.
1866	Toronto	
1867	Kingston	
1868	Hamilton	
1869	London	Military Garrison property near Victoria Park. The fair took place in September, and was attended by the Governor General Sir John Young and his wife, Lady Young, Prince Arthur, Duke of Connaught and Strathearn, and Sir John A. Macdonald.
1870	Toronto	
1871	Kingston	
1872	Hamilton	Held September 23–27. Attended by Lord Dufferin and Lady Dufferin.
1873	London	Military Garrison property near Victoria Park. Held September 22–25—the 28th Provincial Fair was London's fifth. Attended by the Governor-General of Canada, Lord Dufferin.
1874	Toronto	
1875	Kingston	
1876	Hamilton	
1877	London	Military Garrison property near Victoria Park. (The fairgrounds in London moved to their current Queen's Park location on September 19, 1887).
1878	Toronto	Last year Fair was held and first time at Exhibition Grounds by New Fort with Crystal Palace disassembled and rebuilt there.

Following Toronto's decision to create a permanent fair (Toronto Industrial Exhibition or now the Canadian National Exhibition), the provincial fair was replaced by the Dominion Exhibition from 1879 until 1913.

The remaining cities that continue with their existing fairs are:

- Kingston: continued with the Frontenac Agricultural Society Fair that began in 1825 on an irregular pattern to 1925, thereafter the Kingston Fair has been held annually
- Hamilton: the closest fair in the city has been the Ancaster Fall Fair held since 1850
- London: continued with the Western Fair that began in 1868 and operating since 1885 as the only fall fair in the city

== Other fairs ==
A list of annual agricultural and/or county fairs in Ontario created before or after the establishment of the provincial fair:

- Williamstown Fall Fair 1812–present, Williamstown, ON is the oldest continuing fall fair in Ontario and replacing an unnamed fair that was held in town since 1808
- Kingston Fall Fair - 1912–present, operated by the Kingston and District Agricultural Society. A revival of the previous Midland Fair which operated from 1830 until 1880.
- Norfolk County Fair and Horse Show 1840–present, Simcoe, ON
- East Middlesex Agricultural Fair - 1841. Held annual fairs until 1868 at north-west corner of Talbot and Oxford - London, ON
- Aberfoyle Fall Fair 1842–present, Guelph, ON
- Richmond Fair 1844–present, Ottawa, ON
- Scarboro Fair 1844 to early 20th Century, Scarborough, ON
- Aylmer Fari 1849–present, Alymer, ON
- Ancaster Fair 1850–present, Jersyville, ON
- Brigden Fair 1850–present, Brigden, ON
- Schomberg Fair 1850–present, Schomberg, ON
- Armour, Ryerson & Burk's Falls 1881–present, Burk's Falls, ON
- Barrie Fair 1853–present, Thornton, ON
- Brampton Fall Fair 1853–present, Brampton, ON
- Binbrook Fair 1853–present, Binbrook, ON
- Brampton Fall Fair 1853–present, Caledon, ON
- Beaverton Fall Fair 1855–present, Beaverton, ON
- Spencerville Fair 1855–present, Spencerville, ON
- Aruther Fall Fair 1856–present, Arthur, ON
- Bayfield Fair 1856–present, Bayfield, ON
- Arran Tara Agricultural Society 1857–present, Tara, ON
- Beaver Valley Fall Fair 1870–present, Clarksburg, ON
- Beachburg Fair 1857–present, Beachburg, ON
- Beeton Fall Fair 1857–present, Beeton, ON
- Brooke-Alvinston Watford Fall Fair 1857–present, Alvinston, ON
- Markham Fair 1857–present, Markham, ON
- Almonte Fair 1858–present, Almonte, ON
- Bolton Fall Fair 1858–present, Bolton, ON
- Bobcaygen Fair 1859–present, Bobcaygeon, ON
- Avonmore Fair 1860–present, Avonmore, ON
- Burford Fair 1860–present, Brant, ON
- Brussels Fall Fair 1861–present, Brussels, ON
- Blackstock Fair 1865–present, Blackstock, ON
- Bracebridge Fall Fair & Horse Show 1867–present, Bracebridge, ON
- Western Fair 1868–present, London, ON
- Bonfield Fall Fair 1890–present, Bonfield, ON
- Brooklin Spring Fair 1991–present, Brooklin, ON
- Acton Fall Fair 1913–present, Acton, ON
- Royal Agricultural Winter Fair 1922–present, held in Toronto at Exhibition Place in the Colisium
- Rockton World's Fair 1852–present, Rockton, ON

Other annual fairs around Canada and the United States:

- Hants County Exhibition c. 1765 and annual since 1815 - Windsor, NS
- Great New York State Fair 1841 - NY State
- Provincial Agricultural Fair of Lower Canada - created in 1847 with Montreal hosting fair in 1853 but since ended. Expo Richmond Fair is the only visible and annual fall fair remaining in Quebec (since 1856)
- Royal Manitoba Winter Fair 1882 - Winnipeg, MB
- Central Canada Exhibition 1888–2010, in Ottawa
- Pacific National Exhibition 1910 - Vancouver, BC
- Canadian Western Agribition 1971 - Regina, SK

other annual agricultural events in Ontario

- The International Plowing Match held annually since 1913 in a different location in Ontario each year, has become the largest outdoor agricultural and rural fair in North America.
