= Sooke Fall Fair =

- Genre: fall fair
- Location: Sooke, British Columbia
- Years active: 107

The Sooke Fall Fair is an annual fair held in Sooke, British Columbia. It is held at the Sooke Community Hall on Vancouver Island, Canada, every September. Established in 1913, it is one of the Sooke community's longest-running annual events.

The fair holds competitions, with adult and junior categories including photography, painting, drawing, embroidery, knitting, carving, preserves, vegetables, and baking. First Nations artwork and traditional crafts are also displayed.

No fair was held in 1917–18, 1942–44 or 2020.

== See also ==
Other Canadian annual fairs

- Canadian National Exhibition - Toronto
- Calgary Stampede - Calgary
- Edmonton K-Days - Edmonton
- Pacific National Exhibition - Vancouver
- Central Canada Exhibition - Ottawa
- Canadian Lakehead Exhibition - Thunder Bay
- Markham Fair - Markham, Ontario
- Red River Exhibition - Winnipeg
- Royal Agricultural Winter Fair - Toronto
- Royal Manitoba Winter Fair - Brandon, Manitoba
- Schomberg Fair - Schomberg, Ontario
- Streetsville Bread and Honey Festival - Mississauga
- Western Fair - London, Ontario
