= Markham Fair =

Annual country fair in Markham, Ontario, Canada

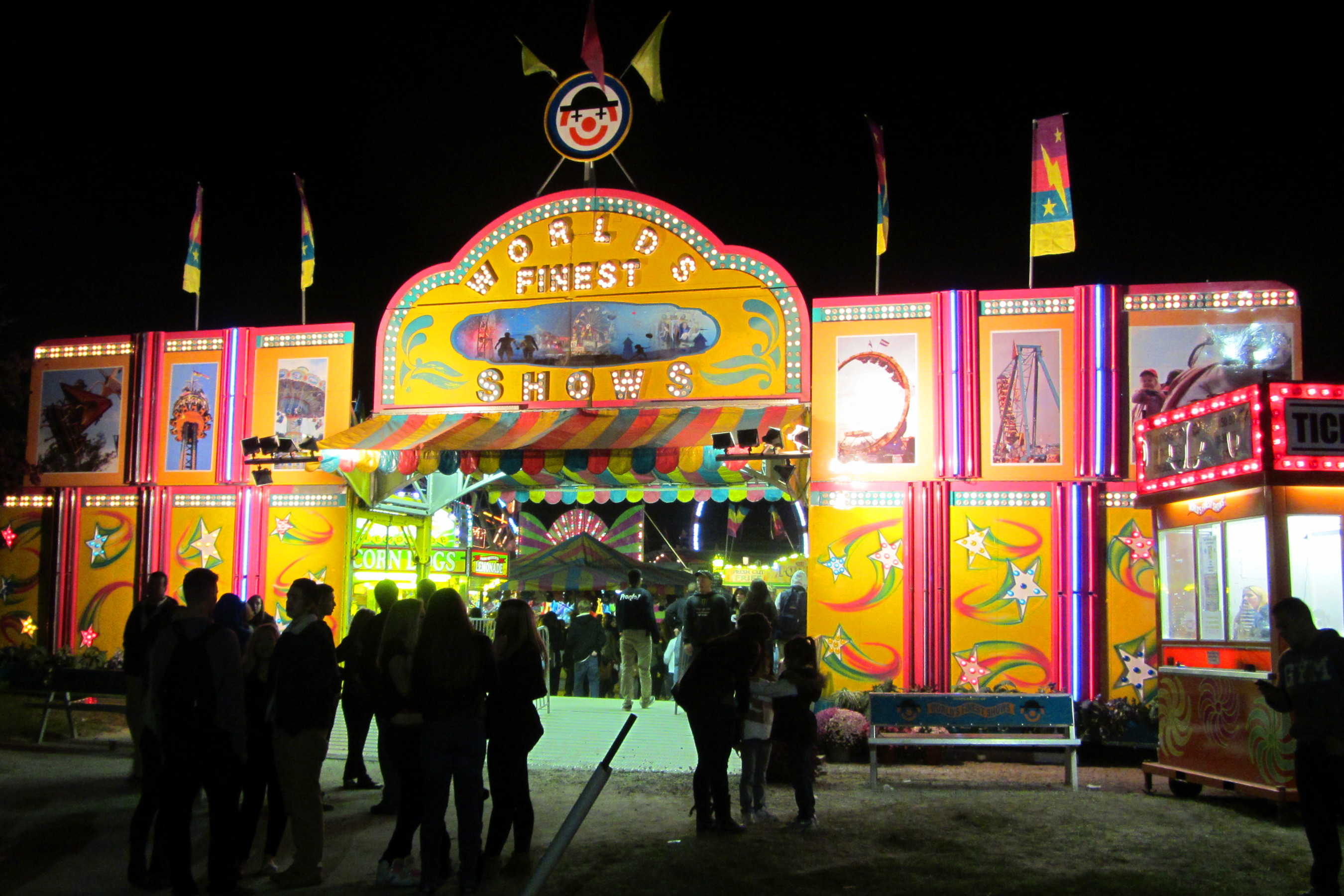
- One of the fair's shows at night
- Genre: fall fair/Agricultural show
- Dates: 4 days (week before Thanksgiving: last week of September or first week of October)
- Location: Markham, Ontario
- Coordinates: 43.92472°N 79.29478°W
- Years active: 182 years
- Founded: 1844
- Website: https://markhamfair.ca

Markham Fair is one of Canada's oldest country fairs, an annual event established in 1844. It is located in Markham, Ontario and hosted by the Markham and East York Agricultural Society. With over 700 volunteers working on more than 70 committees, Markham Fair is the largest community-based volunteer organization in Canada. The fair and fairgrounds are owned by the agricultural society.

The fair occurs annually on the weekend before Thanksgiving, and is attended by upwards of 80,000 people annually. Approximately 3,000 exhibitors enter more than 12,000 items, which are judged and put on display during the fair. Promoting excellence through competition in this way makes fairs unique in comparison to other events.

Agricultural societies used to meet on a regular basis to discuss various concepts of agricultural improvement such as livestock development and increased grain yields. Often the society would collectively purchase a bull or seed grain, which would be made available to members only. The fall fair would then be an opportunity for the farmers to compete by showing off the fruits of their labour.

Advances in technology and communication have reduced the need for agricultural societies to provide this service, but the Markham Fair continues to showcase the community’s talents and products in a friendly, competitive setting.

As well as the competitive displays, the community is further brought together to enjoy various forms of entertainment such as horse and tractor pulls, a demolition derby, midway rides, and displays of farm animals.

The 2020 Markham Fair was cancelled due to the COVID-19 pandemic. This marked the Fair's third period of cancellation, as it was also cancelled in 1917 and 1918 due to World War I and from 1942 to 1944 due to World War II.

The 2021 Fair was held but required prepurchased tickets and physical distancing by means of one way walk through fairgrounds. Food vendors were available near the exit but there was no midway.

== Fairgrounds ==
The fairgrounds are located in northern Markham at the northeast corner of McCowan Road and Elgin Mills Road and sits on 104 acres (42 ha) of former farm land (once farmed by Jonathan 'John' Williamson) and Stuart and Trevor Watson.

The site has several buildings used to house trade shows and other events. A 1/2-mile track and 4 wood stables are used to store animals. To the east of the fairgrounds is Little Rouge Creek.

The original fairground was located at the present day Markham Village Library at southeast corner of Main Street and Highway 7 (farmland of Robert Goodfellow Armstrong and Wellington Hotel). The fair moved to the current site in 1977, as the original fairground area grew less agricultural.

The current Markham Village library building was built to mimic the shape of the old Agricultural Hall that once stood at the site (along what is now Highway 7 on the south side from Washington Street to Jerman Street). A fire in 1916 burned down the new hall, ice rink and other buildings (barns). Only the rink was rebuilt (years later in 1963) on the site and currently part of the Markham Village Community Centre. The area where the track once sat are now homes with Reeves Park along Main Street.

== Events ==
Many shows and events are showcased throughout the duration of the fair. In previous years these shows have included:

- Agri-food Tent Shows (cooking shows)
- Gymnastics demonstration
- Freestyle Moto-Cross (FMX) Bike Demonstration
- Demolition Derby
- Tractor Pull
- Sheep Shearing Demonstration

=== Other events ===
A number of local events use the fairgrounds outside of the fair days including home shows, trade shows and warehouse sales.

=== Midway ===
World's Finest Shows runs the midway located at the West Gate of the fairgrounds.

== History ==
The earliest recorded fair held in Markham was in 1857 at the fairgrounds then located on the southeast corner of Main and Wellington Streets (now Main Street Markham and Highway 7). Prior to that, fairs were held in nearby Unionville (today a neighbourhood of Markham) in 1855.

The fair attracted farm participation from east section of York County based loosely on the York East (provincial electoral district) (East York, Scarborough, Markham, Whitchurch).

In 1865 Captain William Armstrong granted 5 acres (2.0 ha) of his land for the fairgrounds to build several buildings (grandstand, track, stalls, ice rink, exhibition hall) including a single floor agricultural hall. A new two floor hall, ticket office and rink was planned in 1894 and in 1916 a fire destroyed those buildings and were later replaced with a larger Agricultural Hall (Crystal Palace) to house the fair. The massive brick 220 feet (67 m) by 74 feet (23 m) rink would serve as an early recreation centre.

In 1963 the fair buildings were demolished to make way for the Markham Village Cenotaph and Community Centre (including indoor ice rink). In 1977 the Fair relocated to its current site where the four-day fair is held annually on the weekend preceding Thanksgiving. The Markham Village Library was built in 1980-1981 (on land bought by the then Town of Markham in 1975) now occupies the site of the old fairgrounds and mimics the barrel vault design of the old Agricultural Hall.

== Board of directors ==
The society is an Ontario corporation that owns and operates the fair and its properties. It is governed by a board of 24 directors, who are elected at each annual meeting for a three-year period, and six junior directors (between the ages of 18 and 26) who are elected annually for a one-year period. All directors are elected by members of the society who attend the annual meeting. From among the directors, the President (Chair) and two vice-presidents are elected following the annual meeting, along with a Treasurer, General Manager, and Secretary.

=== Mission ===
The mission of the society is to encourage an awareness of agriculture and to promote improvements in the quality of life of persons living in an agricultural community by:

- researching and developing programs to meet the needs of the community;
- holding annual agricultural exhibitions featuring competitions for which prizes may be awarded;
- promoting the conservation of natural resources;
- encouraging the beautification of the community; and by
- supporting and providing facilities to encourage activities to enrich the community

In addition, there are over 750 volunteers involved with the operations, which fill the board seats and form some 75 committees, which share administrative duties and the Fair operating procedures.

== See also ==
Other Canadian annual fairs

- Canadian National Exhibition - Toronto
- Calgary Stampede - Calgary
- Edmonton K-Days - Edmonton
- Pacific National Exhibition - Vancouver
- Central Canada Exhibition - Ottawa
- Canadian Lakehead Exhibition - Thunder Bay
- Red River Exhibition - Winnipeg
- Royal Agricultural Winter Fair - Toronto
- Royal Manitoba Winter Fair - Brandon, Manitoba
- Schomberg Fair - Schomberg, Ontario
- Sooke Fall Fair - Sooke, British Columbia
- Streetsville Bread and Honey Festival - Mississauga
- Western Fair - London, Ontario
