= Canadian Lakehead Exhibition =

Regional fair

- Genre: Agricultural and entertainment
- Dates: Early August
- Locations: Thunder Bay, Ontario
- Sponsors: Select Shows
- Website: The Canadian Lakehead Exhibition

The Canadian Lakehead Exhibition (CLE) is an annual regional fair in Thunder Bay, Ontario, Canada. Similar in nature to the Canadian National Exhibition in Toronto, it features local and regional artisans and farmers, a midway, concessions and numerous other activities geared towards families and people of all ages. The exhibition takes place yearly in early August and is held on the CLE grounds in the Intercity area.

== Operation ==
The CLE is a not-for-profit organization controlled by a volunteer board of local community members. In addition to running the annual fair the board oversees the rental and leasing of facilities located on the fair grounds.

One consistent tenant of the CLE grounds is the Thunder Bay Country Market, which is open twice per week in the Dove Building.

== Facilities ==
In addition to the annual fair the CLE grounds have several buildings that are used throughout the year.

They include:

- The Heritage Building
- The Coliseum Building
- The Dorothy E. Dove Building
- The Claydon Building (also known as the Soccer Plex)
- SilverCity Theater (owned by Cineplex Entertainment and leasing property from the exhibition)

== See also ==
Other Canadian annual fairs

- Canadian National Exhibition - Toronto
- Calgary Stampede - Calgary
- Edmonton K-Days - Edmonton
- Pacific National Exhibition - Vancouver
- Central Canada Exhibition - Ottawa
- Markham Fair - Markham, Ontario
- Red River Exhibition - Winnipeg
- Royal Agricultural Winter Fair - Toronto
- Royal Manitoba Winter Fair - Brandon, Manitoba
- Schomberg Fair - Schomberg, Ontario
- Sooke Fall Fair - Sooke, British Columbia
- Streetsville Bread and Honey Festival - Mississauga
- Western Fair - London, Ontario
