= Western Fair =

Annual fair held in London, Ontario, Canada

Coordinates: 42.9889°N 81.2191°W

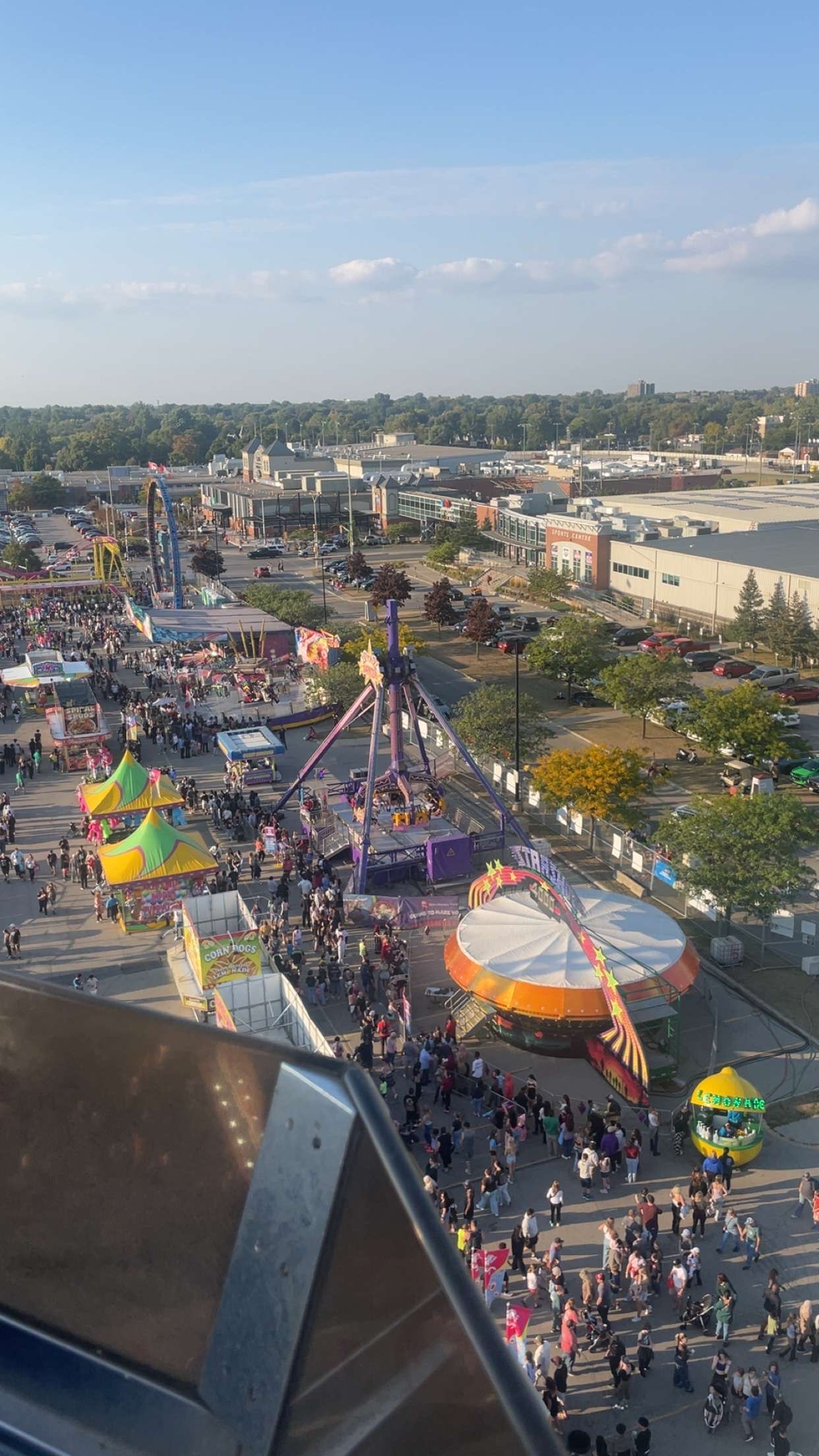
- A photo of the fair taken on the ferris wheel in 2025
- Genre: fall fair/Agricultural show
- Dates: early September
- Location: London, Ontario
- Years active: 160 years
- Founded: 1866
- Website: https://www.westernfair.ca/

The Western Fair is a fair held annually in London, Ontario, Canada in early September.

== History ==
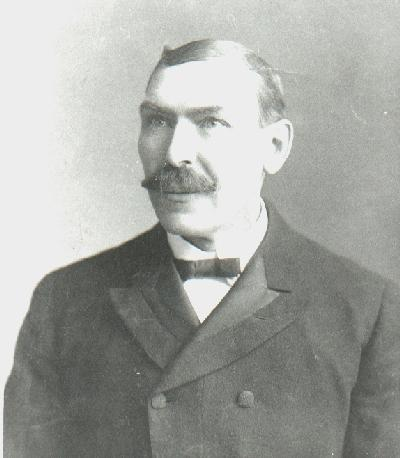
John Huse Saunders

The first Western Fair was held in September 1868 in downtown London, northeast of the current location of Victoria Park. Organizers had hoped to use the Crystal Palace Barracks as the main exhibition area. Livestock shows took place on the parade grounds outside the Crystal Palace.

In 1887, when the fair gained legal status through the Provincial Charter and Act of Incorporation, it moved to 900 King Street in east London, where the fairgrounds remain today. The present fairgrounds were purchased for $65,000. Except for an eight-year period between 1939 and 1947 when the Canadian Department of National Defence occupied the grounds and 2020–2021, the Western Fair has operated on the new site.

John Huse Saunders was President of the Western Fair Association (WFA) for 22 years. He devoted more than 50 years to the Western Fair and was known throughout North America as a poultry breeder. After receiving Honorary Presidential status the WFA changed the by-laws and limited the term to three years.

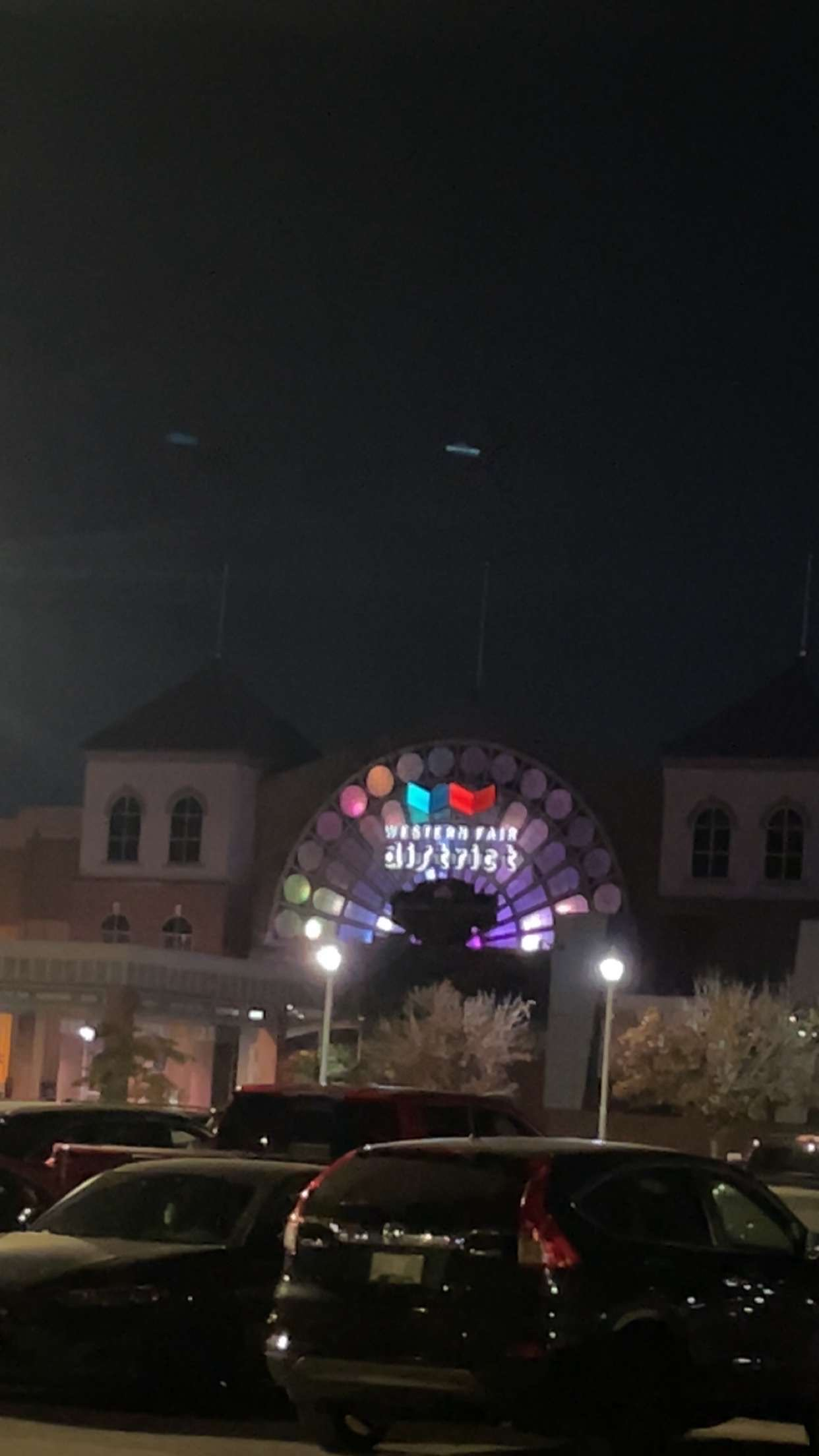
A photo of the Western Fair District building

In 2011, the former Western Fair Association re-branded itself as the Western Fair District, to better represent the reality that the grounds and building facilities had expanded beyond a 9-day fair to year-round activities.

With 2020 & 2021's cancellation due to the COVID-19 pandemic, the 145th was deferred to 2021.

== Rides ==
As of 2026, the rides are;

- Super Miami
- Downdraft
- Scooter
- Mega Drop
- Star Dancer
- Mach 3
- Giant Wheel
- Polar Express
- Himalaya
- Pharaoh's Fury
- Cliff Hanger
- Tilt-A-Whirl
- Orbiter
- Haunted Mansion
- Starship 4000
- Euroslide
- Video Funhouse
- Ring Of Fire
- Wave Swinger
- Crazy Mouse
- Mardi Gras
- Remix
- Cuckoo Haus
- Rockin' Tug
- Speedway
- Teacups
- Bumble Bees
- Chopper Charlie
- Merry-go-round
- Dizzy Dragons
- Dragon Coaster
- Flying Elephants
- Jeeps
- Jump Cycles
- Kite Flyer
- Slide
- Monster Trucks
- Mini Jets
- Raptor Run
- Raiders
- Parker City Saloon
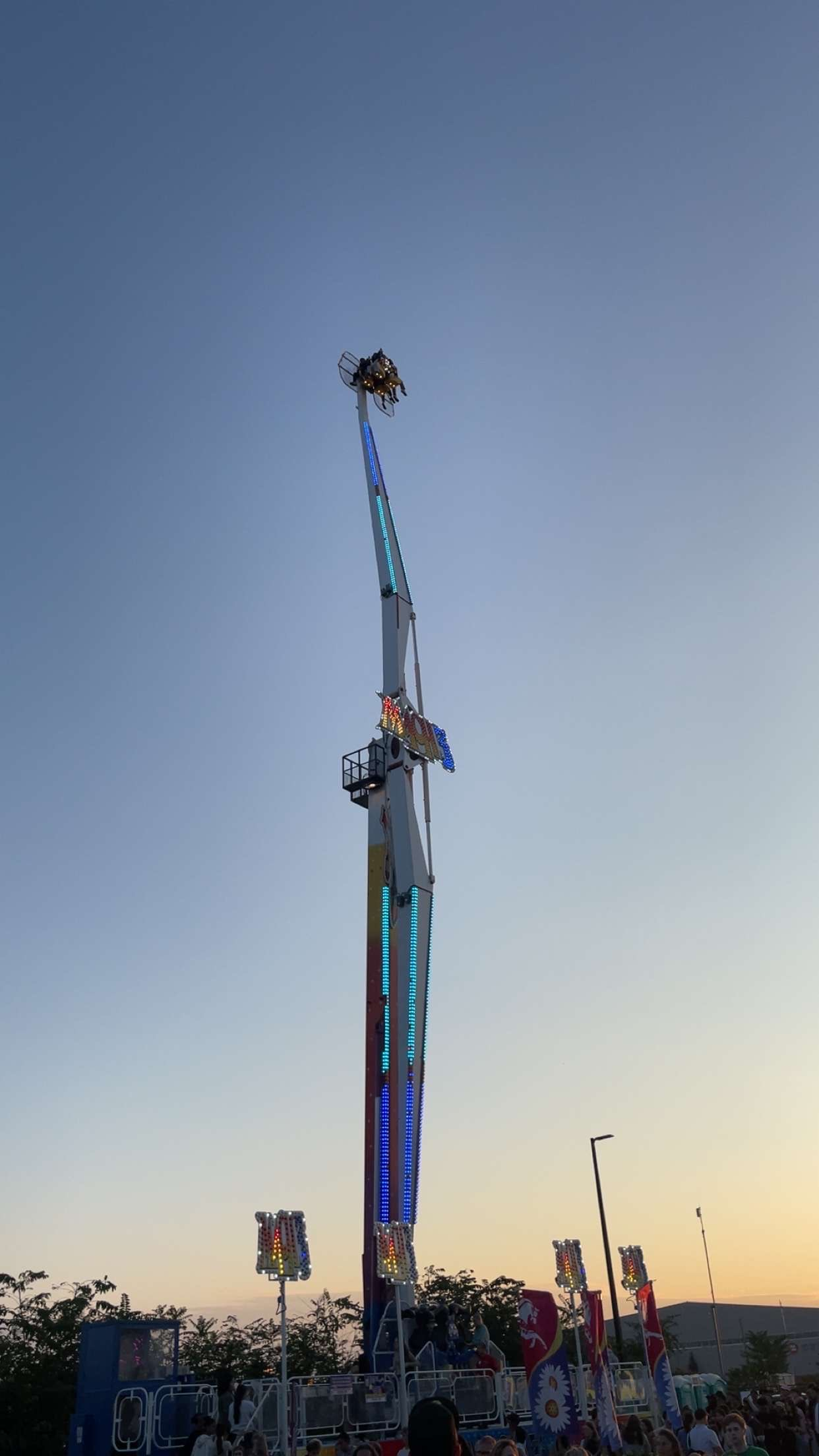
The Mach 3 in 2025

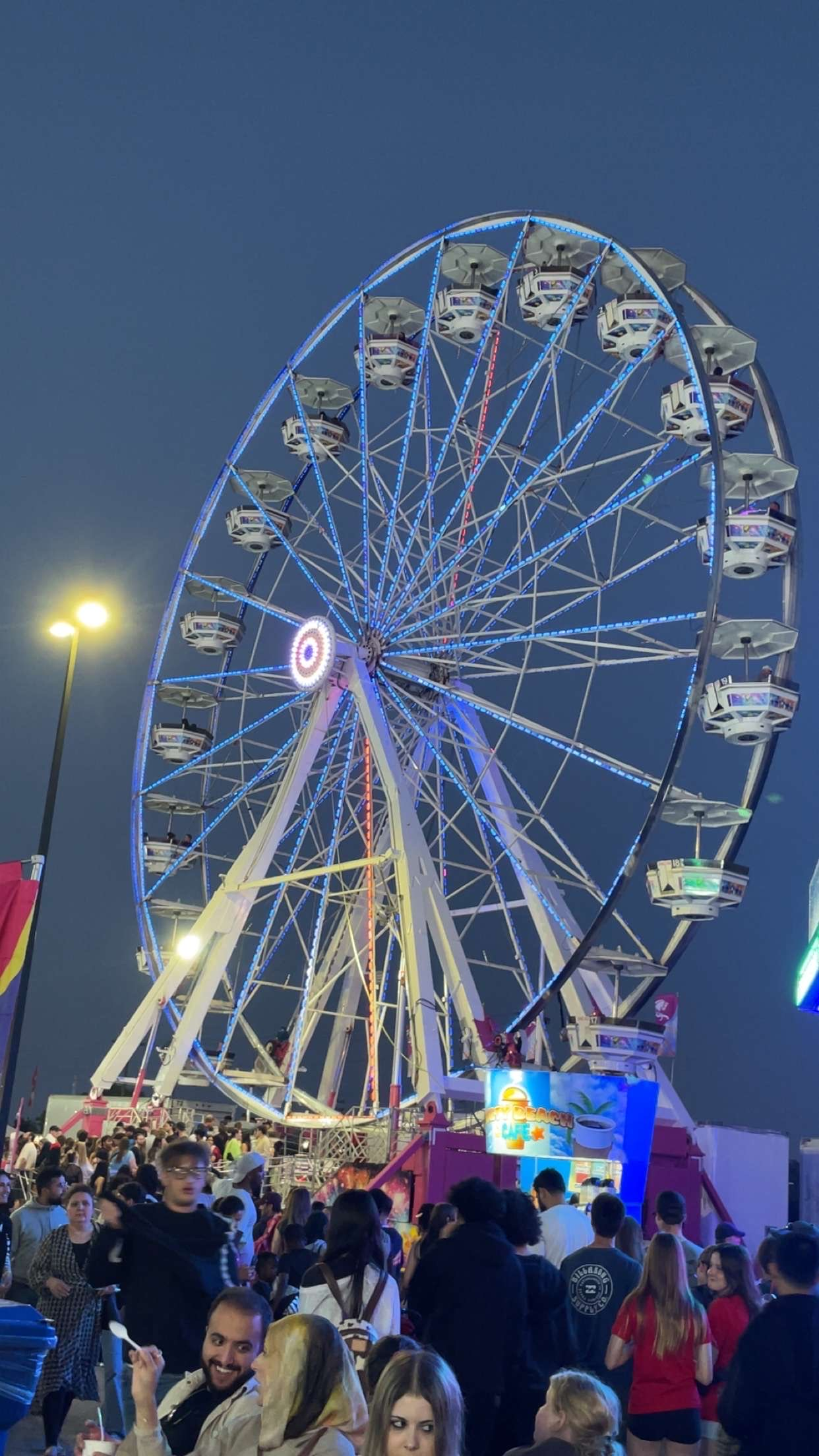
The Giant Wheel in 2025

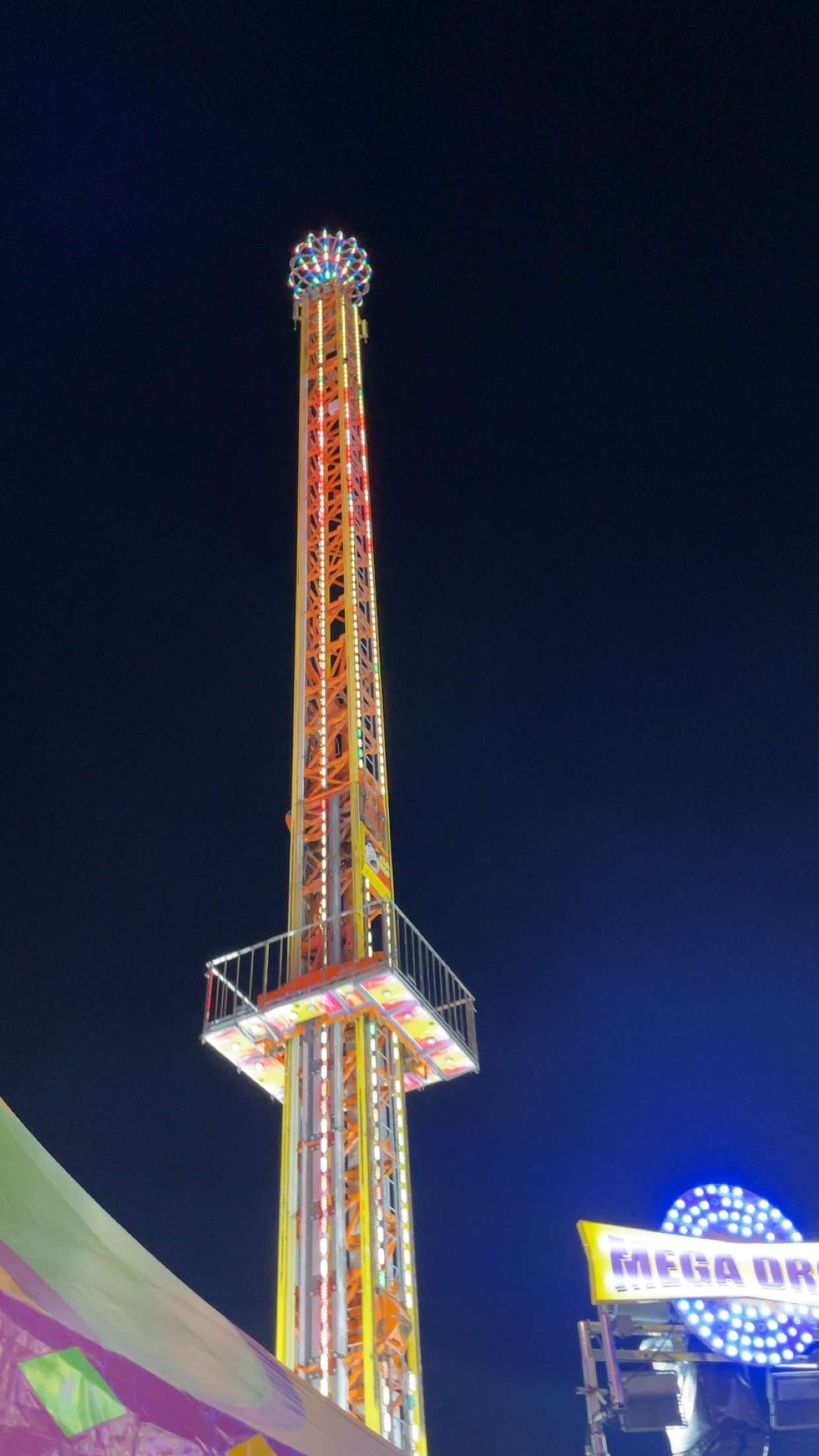
The Mega Drop in 2025

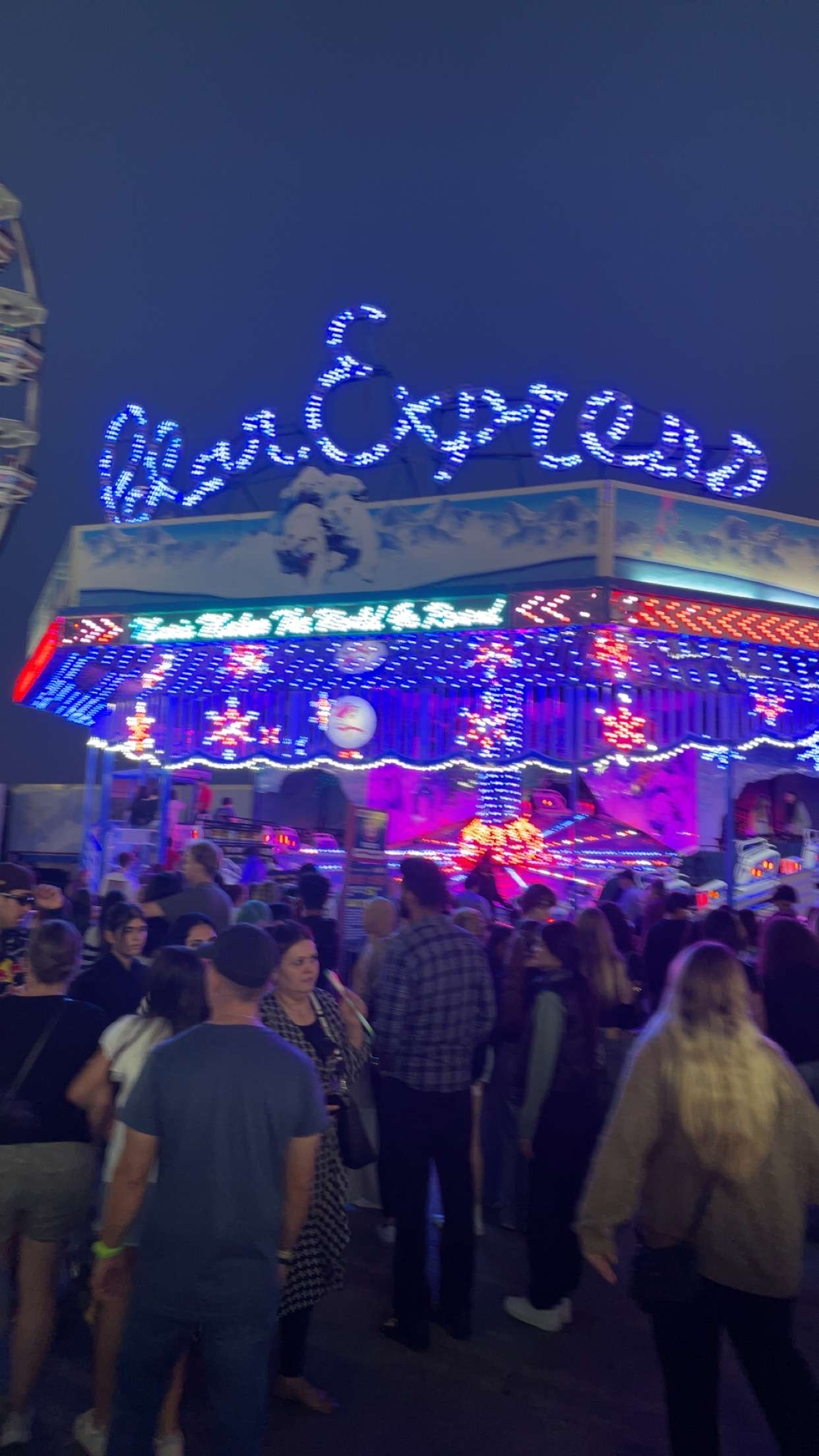
The Polar Express in 2025

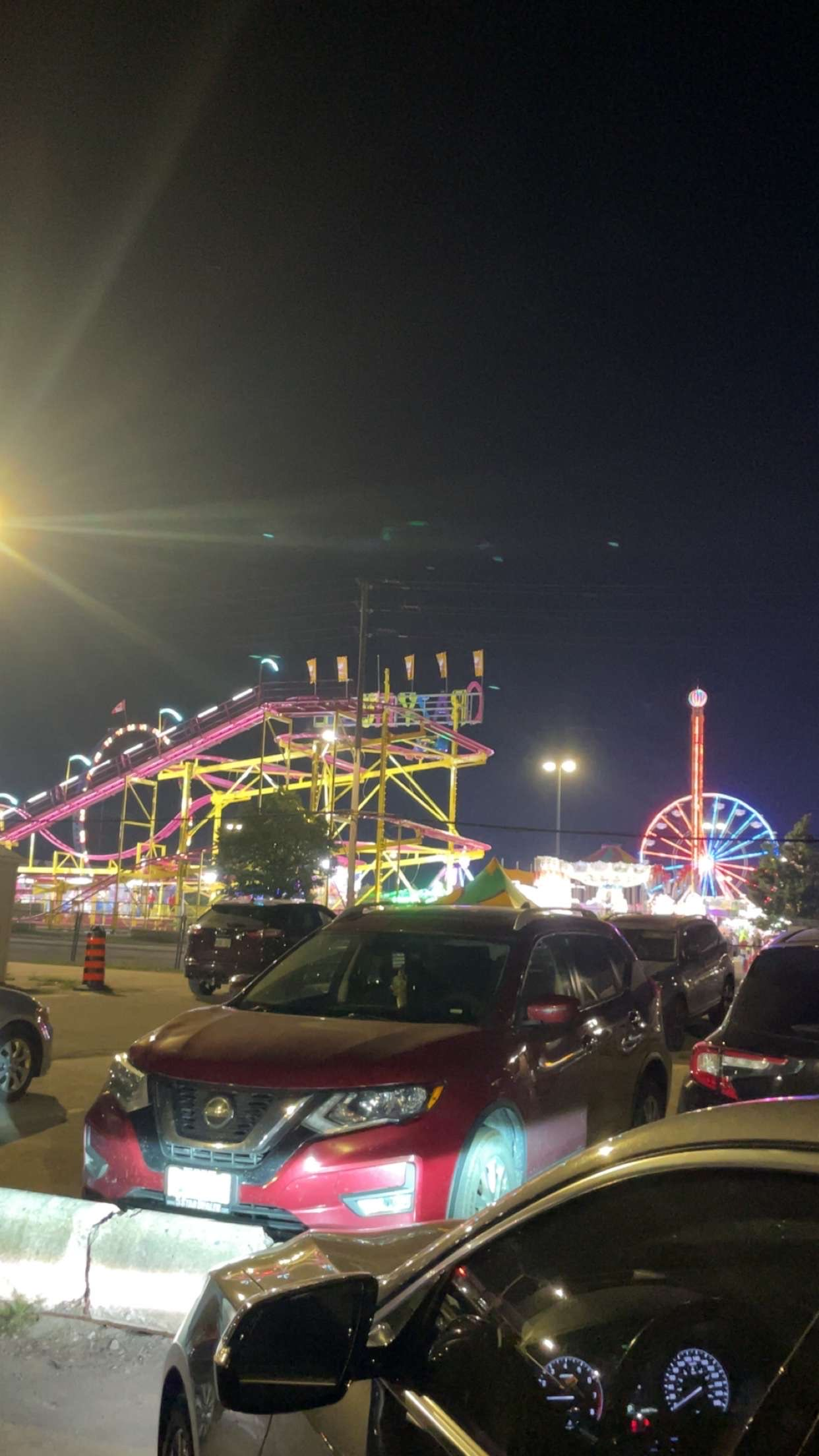
The Crazy Mouse, Mega Drop, Giant Wheel, Wave Swinger and Fire Ball pictured from a nearby parking lot in 2025

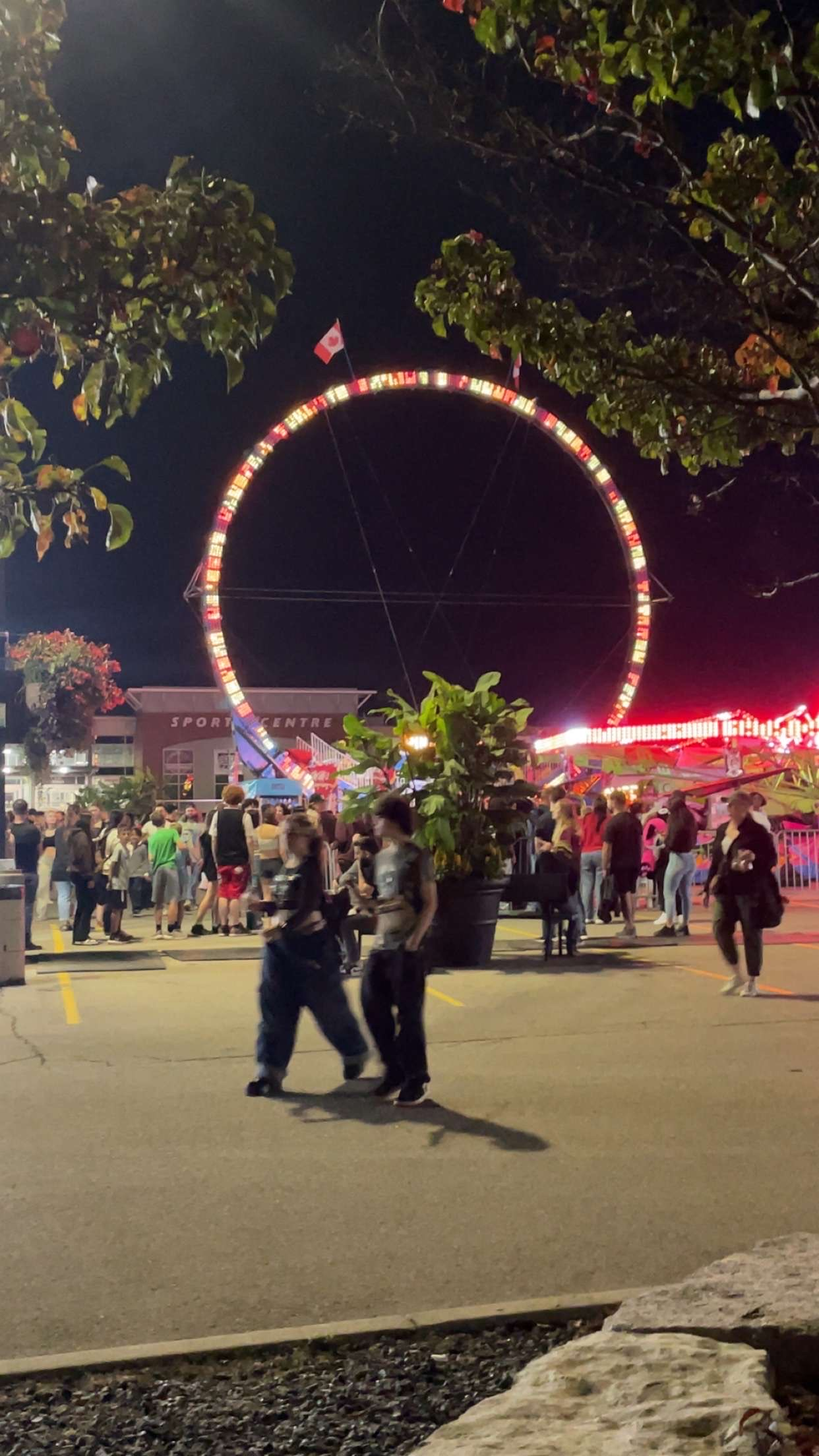
The Fire Ball in 2025

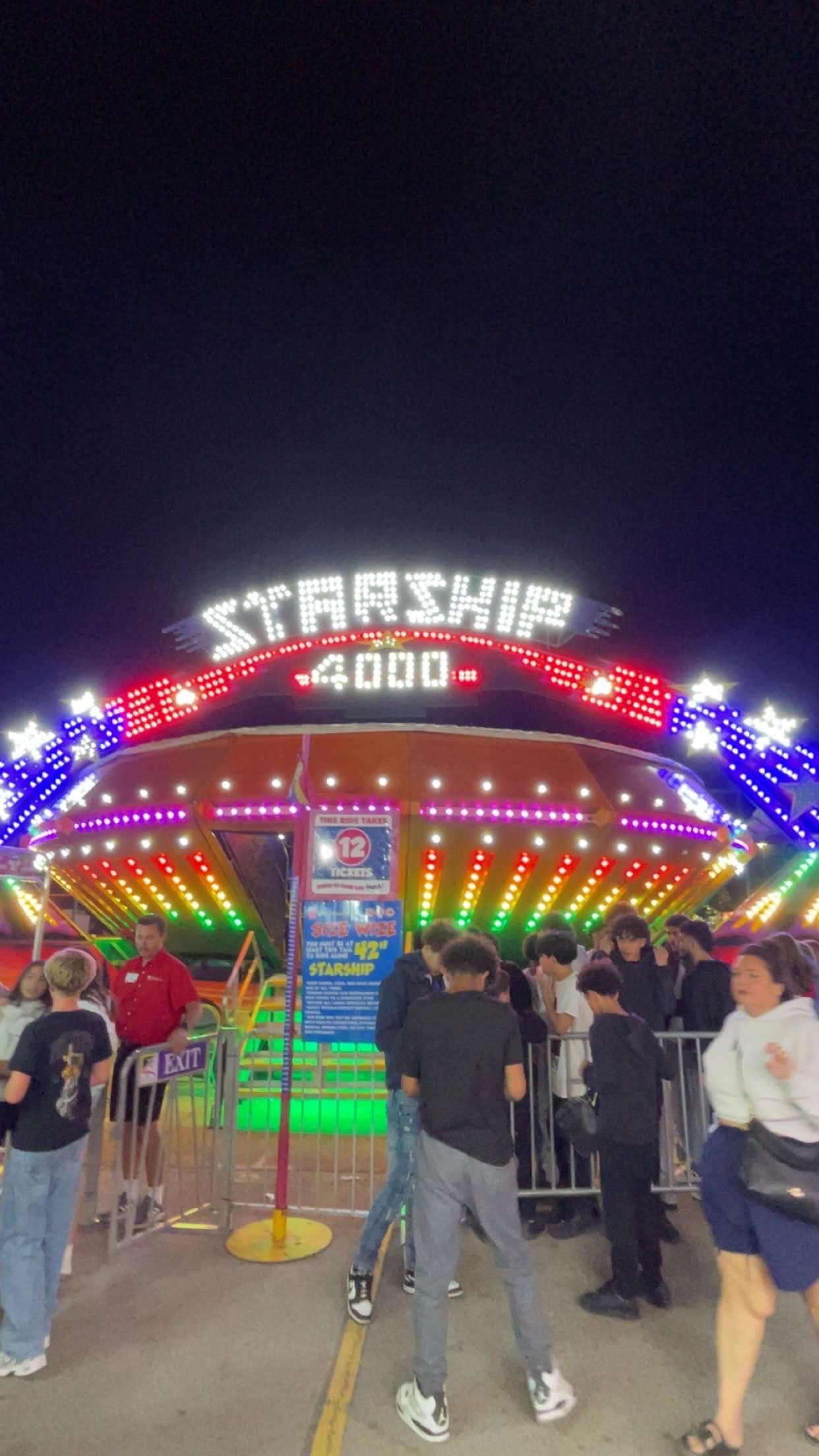
The Starship 4000 in 2025

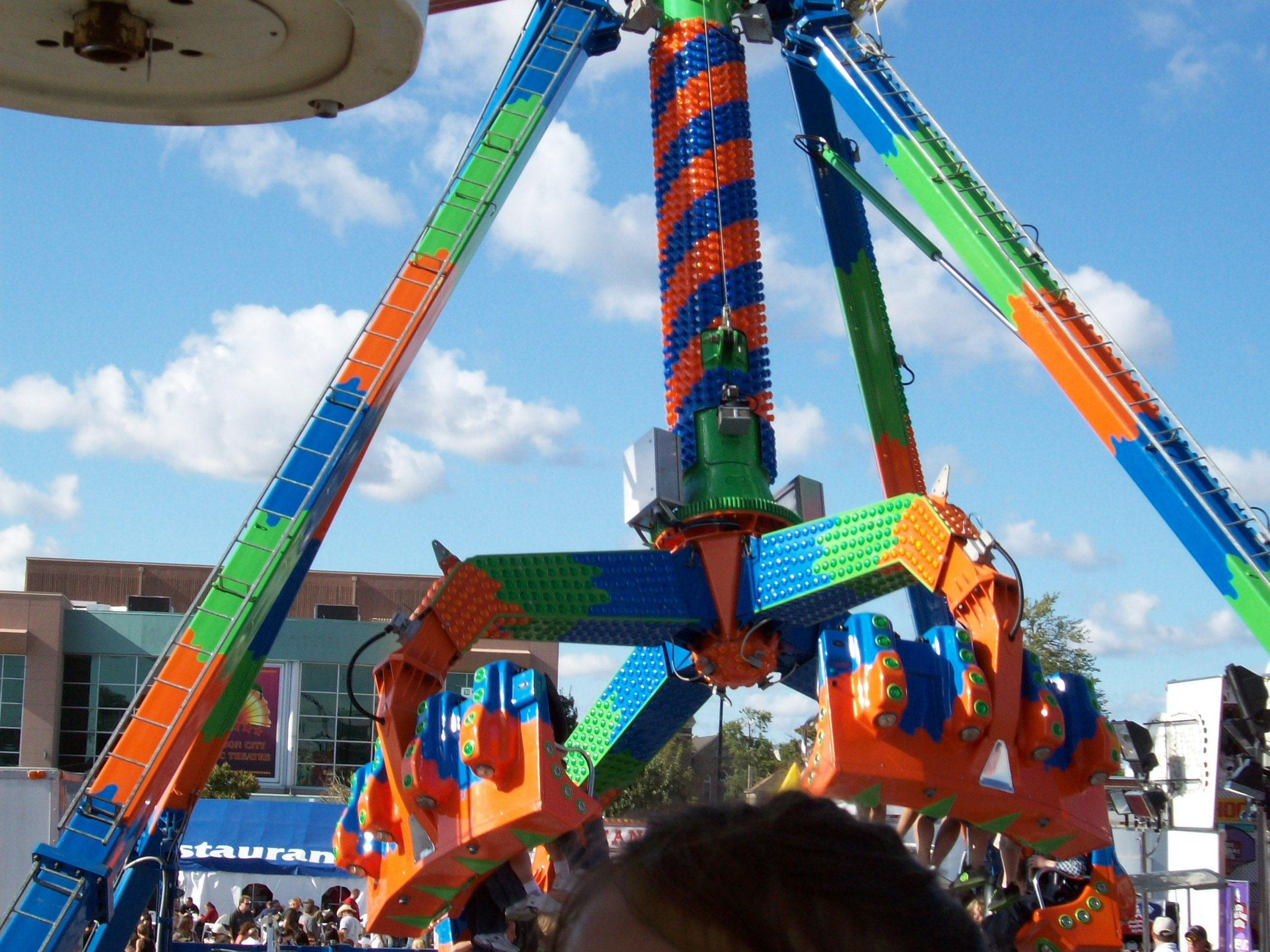
The Star Dancer in 2008

== The fair ==
The Western Fair runs during the second full week of September, starting on Friday and ending on Sunday.

The original basis for the Western Fair was agricultural displays, arts and crafts, and vendors, with a heavy emphasis on competition. Later additions included the midway and booked entertainment acts. A seasonal harness racetrack was opened in 1961, with simulcast betting added later. The racetrack was later separated from the fair proper.

The only 24-hour food vendor at the Western Fair, St. Anne's Church, served meals at the Western Fair from 1947 until 2015, with the proceeds going to local charities and to fund church activities. In 2016, St. Anne's Church did not renew its contract after new regulations restricted its operations to fair open hours only, which would have forced it to operate at a loss.

== Facilities ==
The Western Fairgrounds are open 12 months a year. In addition to the fair itself, the fairgrounds are also home to the horse racing Western Fair Raceway, the OLG casino slot machines, an agricultural complex, and several large buildings which are frequently rented out for events. It also used to be home to the former Western Fair Museum and Archives and the former IMAX theatre, both of which closed in 2005. The IMAX theatre was taken over by London Musical Theatre Productions in 2007.

=== Raceway and slot machines ===
London's primary standardbred horse racing facility is the Western Fair Raceway. A slot machine facility on the site was opened to the public on September 28, 1999, as authorised by the Ontario Lottery and Gaming Corporation. As of April 2008, the facility contained 750 slot machines and has seen 9.4 million people, supported by a $15 million staff budget.

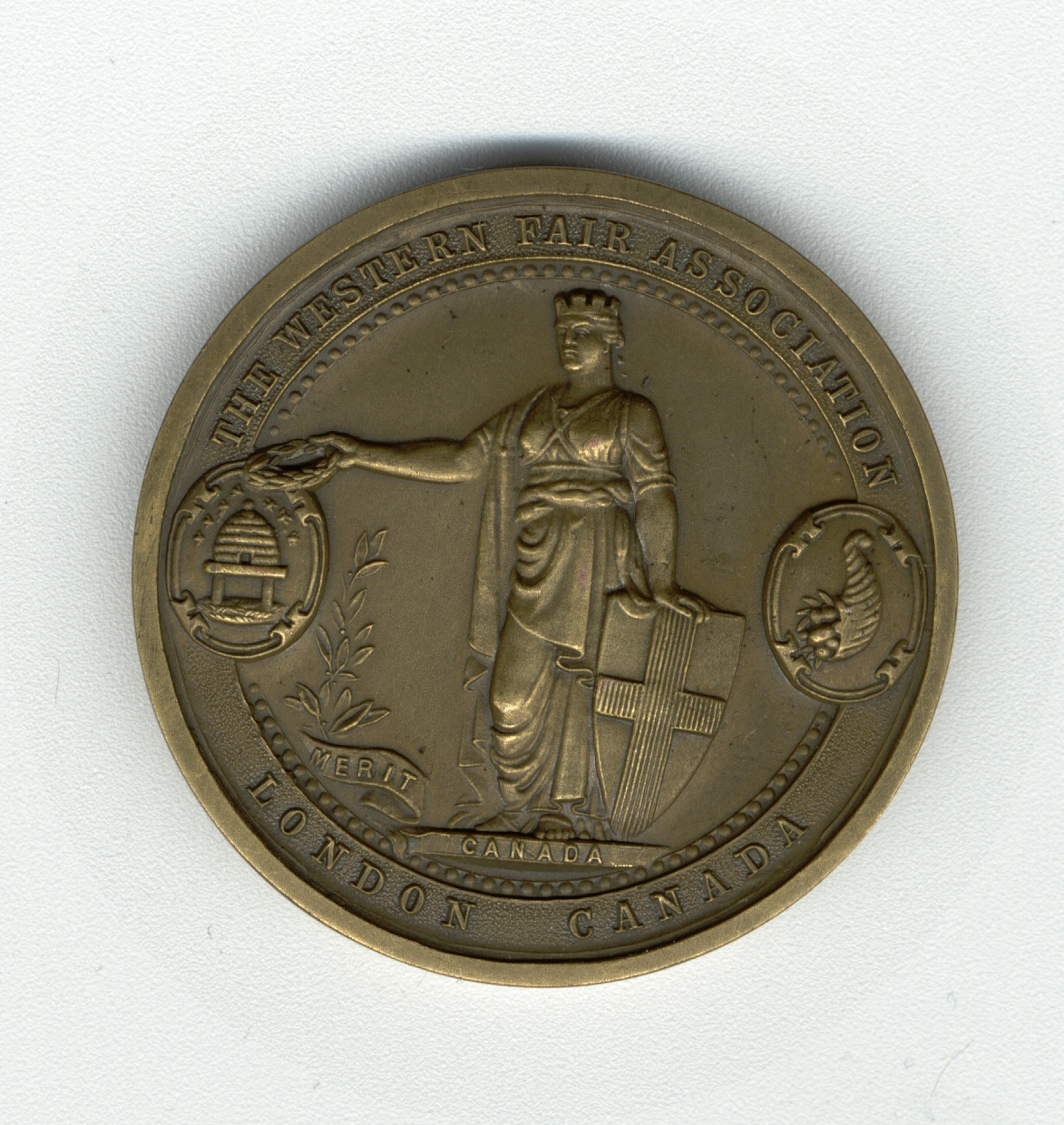
Western Fair Medal circa 1900s

=== Museum and archives ===
The Western Fair Museum and Archives began with the efforts of Inge Sanmyia, who was working on her PhD in history at Wilfrid Laurier University in Waterloo, Ontario in 1997. Her three-month summer research project soon became the foundations for the Western Fair Museum and Archives. Since 1997 she has designed historical displays for the Fair and written its history: A Celebration of Excellence: The history of the Western Fair. During its existence, the WFA Museum and Archives accumulated material from the Western Fair, members of the public and historians, and catalogued the Western Fair Archives list of photographs. Through the acquisition of these materials, the museum put on regular short and long-term displays as well as distinct displays during each fall fair. For example:

- Transportation and the Fair 1999
- The Great War 2001
- Ann May (Dingwall) Queen of the Cowgirls 2002
- Tings to Remember 2003
- London Firefighters 2004

In its efforts to record and catalogue the material it had acquired, an extensive systems of records and labelling was set up and a Finding Aid was designed and installed in the in-house computer system for easy access. The Museum was affiliated with: Canadian Museums Association, Canadian Heritage Information Network, and Virtual Museum of Canada.

Examples of Headings

- WFA = Western Fair Association
- WF = Western Fair
- HS = Horse Show
- LSC = Livestock Catalogue
- FS = Farm Show
- SPF = Sports Fair
- ND = No Date
- PL = Prize Lists

Examples of Series codes by Box

- 1 WFA 1000A
- 6 HS 7000
- 7 LSC 7000

Examples of Archival Box Contents

- Box No. 3 WFA 1000C
- City presentation 1970 Fair expansion
- Government of Canada (ND) Exhibition survey
- Comparison of State Fairs 1969 US & Canada
- Midway games proposal (ND)
- Central Canada Exhibition Association(CCEA) 1972 Survey
- International Association of Fairs & Expositions 1985 Directory
- Report of Western Fair Research

=== IMAX theatre ===
An IMAX film theatre was situated at the Western Fair site for nine years, closing on September 30, 2005, due to low attendance (an average of only 100,000 patrons per year). After the IMAX equipment was removed, the theatre was leased and renovated by Dale Henderson, a retired engineer and former leader of the Stardust Orchestra, who opened the London City Music Theatre in October 2007.

== See also ==
Other Canadian annual and/or agricultural fairs

- Canadian National Exhibition – Toronto
- Calgary Stampede – Calgary
- Edmonton K-Days – Edmonton
- Pacific National Exhibition – Vancouver
- Central Canada Exhibition – Ottawa
- Canadian Lakehead Exhibition – Thunder Bay
- Markham Fair – Markham, Ontario
- Red River Exhibition – Winnipeg
- Royal Agricultural Winter Fair – Toronto
- Royal Manitoba Winter Fair – Brandon, Manitoba
- Schomberg Fair – Schomberg, Ontario
- Sooke Fall Fair – Sooke, British Columbia
