= Red River Exhibition =

Annual festival in Manitoba, Canada

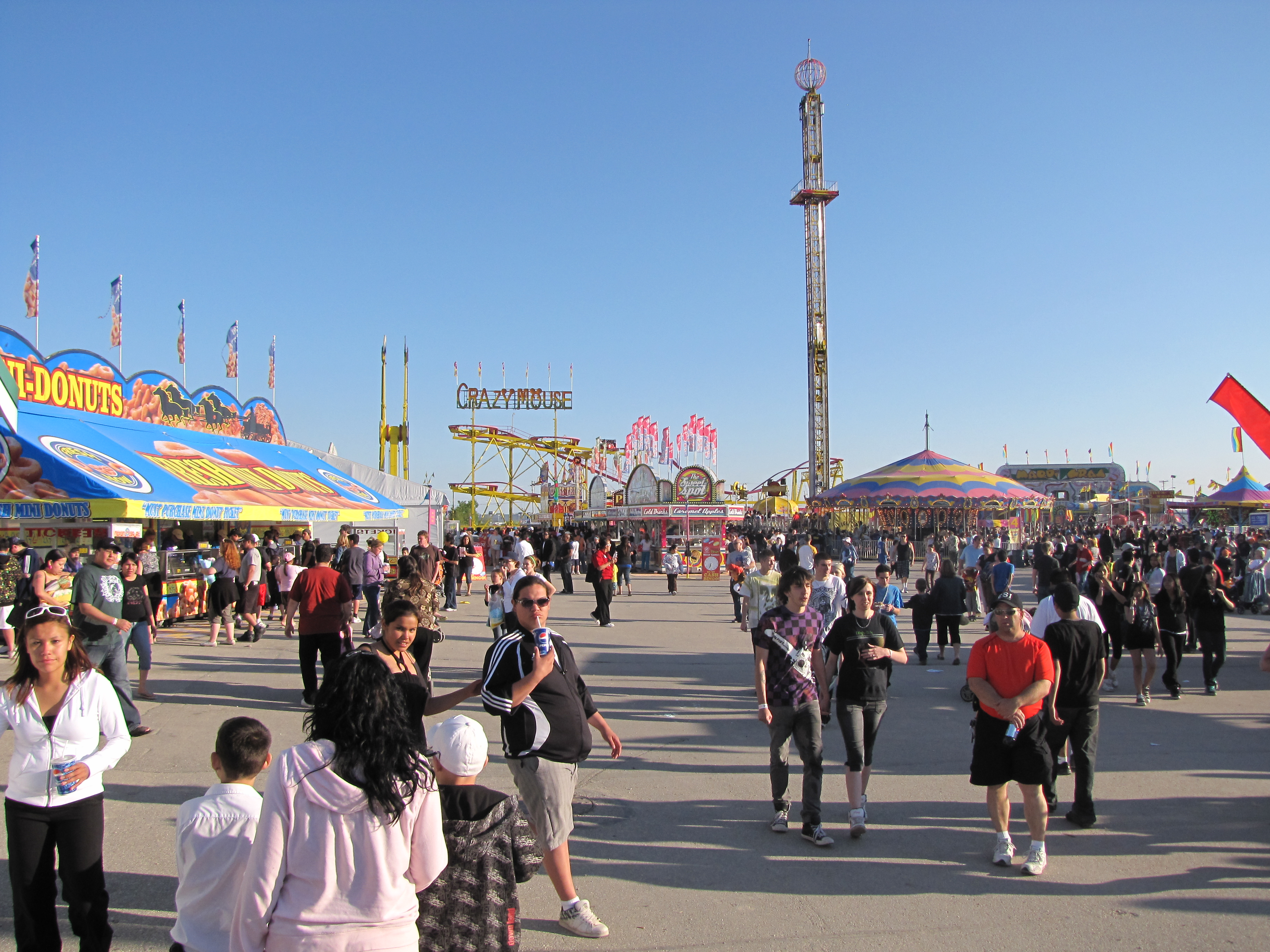
- The Red River Exhibition 2009
- Genre: Summer fair
- Dates: June
- Frequency: Annual
- Location: 3977 Portage Ave.
- Coordinates: 49.8860°N 97.3271°W
- Country: Canada
- Established: 1952; 74 years ago
- Attendance: 233,000 (2011)
- Area: 480 acres (190 ha)
- Website: redriverex.com

The Red River Exhibition (or "The Ex" for short and historically as Manisphere) is a ten-day festival hosted every summer, in June, in Winnipeg, Manitoba. The event takes place at Exhibition Park and features a midway, concerts, stage shows, professional wrestling and agricultural exhibits. The park is operated by the Red River Exhibition Association, a not-for-profit organization. Winnipeg's The Guess Who played there in 2015, and the Crash Test Dummies played there in 1992.

The Ex was started in 1952 at the Osborne Stadium complex near the Manitoba Legislative Building. It later moved to the Polo Park Race Track and then to the Winnipeg Stadium, Winnipeg Arena, and Winnipeg Velodrome facilities.

In 1997, it moved to its present location. The total amount of land owned at the western edge of Winnipeg 480 acres (1.9 km^{2}). Red River Exhibition Park was built as a multi-purpose facility on only 90 of those acres leaving almost 400 acres (1.6 km^{2}) for future growth and expansion.

The annual fair continues to grow despite the fact its arrival is frequently accompanied by significant amounts of rain, (seven days out of ten in 2014). The record for attendance at the Ex is 223,183 paid visitors, set in 2011.

== See also ==
Other Canadian annual fairs

- Canadian National Exhibition - Toronto
- Calgary Stampede - Calgary
- Edmonton K-Days - Edmonton
- Pacific National Exhibition - Vancouver
- Central Canada Exhibition - Ottawa
- Canadian Lakehead Exhibition - Thunder Bay
- Markham Fair - Markham, Ontario
- Royal Agricultural Winter Fair - Toronto
- Royal Manitoba Winter Fair - Brandon, Manitoba
- Schomberg Fair - Schomberg, Ontario
- Sooke Fall Fair - Sooke, British Columbia
- Streetsville Bread and Honey Festival - Mississauga
- Western Fair - London, Ontario
