= Ottawa SuperEX =

Defunct annual exhibition in Ottawa, Canada

Coordinates: 45°24′00″N 75°41′00″W

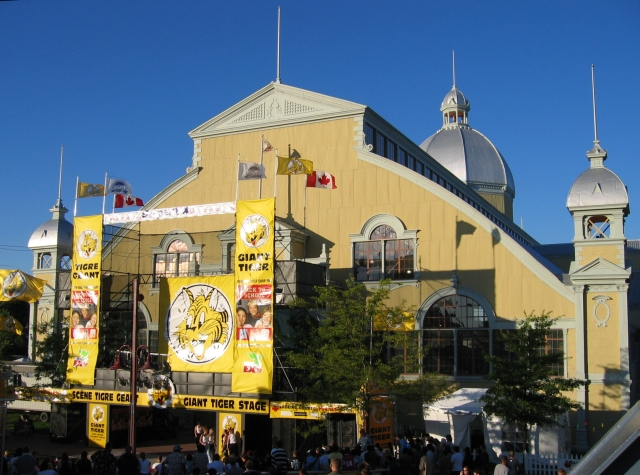
Aberdeen Pavilion SuperEx 2004

Ottawa SuperEX (officially the Central Canada Exhibition) was an eleven-day annual exhibition that took place every August at Lansdowne Park in Ottawa, Ontario. The exhibition provided exhibits, entertainment and amusements indoors in the buildings on site and outdoors on the grounds. The Central Canada Exhibition Association operated a fair annually from 1888 until 2010, except during World War II. The fair was on hiatus due to plans to redevelop Lansdowne Park and the Association continued to work towards finding opportunities to bring back SuperEX. It was announced in December 2015 that the Ottawa SuperEX board had disbanded a year earlier and the Ex would not be returning.

== History ==
Single exhibitions were held on the site in 1875, 1879, 1883 and 1888. The last of these exhibitions was opened on September 20, 1888 by Charles Magee, President of the Exhibition Association, with Prime Minister Sir John A. Macdonald and Governor General Lord Stanley in attendance.

A decision was made to formalize an ongoing annual fair, resulting in the 1888 special event becoming the first of the annual fairs. The 1888 Exhibition Association evolved into a permanent organization, and a lease of the site was agreed to with the City of Ottawa.

Only a few buildings existed at the site at the time, including the first Grandstand, overlooking a dirt track and horse display area. This dirt track and horse display area has evolved into today's Frank Clair Stadium. The primary focus was on agricultural displays, but exhibits included manufacturer's exhibits from the beginning. Livestock was brought to the site and kept in sheds for the duration of the fair. Farm crafts and baking were judged.

The Exhibition operated annually, with the exception of several years during World War II, when the grounds were used by the Canadian military. In 1898, the Aberdeen Pavilion opened for displays. In 1903, the Coliseum opened for displays. In 1909 a new steel and concrete Grandstand was built at a cost of $100,000 to provide seating for nearly 10,000 people. The south side stands were built in 1960. Today's Civic Centre and Grandstand opened in 1967.

Starting in 1974, the Exhibition Association worked to move the Exhibition to a new location, but the Exhibition never moved and in 1994, the City of Ottawa directed the Association to stop searching for a new location. During the period from 1974 to 1994, funds were set aside for the move, and several buildings fell into decline, notably the Aberdeen Pavilion. After the decision was made to keep the fair in place, the Aberdeen Pavilion was restored.

Over time, the Exhibition reduced its agricultural exhibits to the point where there was only a small exhibit in the Aberdeen Pavilion. Musical concerts took place outdoors on the field and indoors in the Civic Centre arena.

The Ex was cancelled for 2011 because it had no site. The exhibition was to move to Albion Road, but the venue would not be ready for August 2011. It was the first time the exhibition has been cancelled since World War II. The suspension of the Ex left its existence in question, with no event held in 2012, 2013, 2014 or 2015. However, the Board continued to work towards finding opportunities to bring back SuperEX. It was announced in December 2015 that the Ottawa SuperEX board had disbanded a year earlier and the Ex would not be returning.

== Venues ==
SuperEx has a handful of buildings that survived re-development:

- Aberdeen Pavilion was built in 1898 by Moses C. Edey and designated as historic building
- Horticulture Building was built in 1914 to replace Horticulture Hall from 1879 and 1888; it was a curling rink in the 1960s and was relocated with re-development of the site
- Eddie Friel Building (which was west of the south-side stands and housed locker rooms, Rough Rider / Renegade's offices and workout equipment) was demolished after 2012 re-development of the site

Most other structures at the site have disappeared:

- Ladies and Arts Building - built c.1879, burned down in a fire in 1907
- Manitoba Hall - c.1880s
- Experimental Farms Building - burned down in a fire in 1907
- Stock and Poultry Building - built 1905 and replaced by Livestock Building in 1950
- Dairy Building - built c. 1880s and replaced in 1903 and 1905; last structure burned down in a fire in 1907
- Grandstand - built c.1888 and burned down in a fire in 1907; replacement torn down for Frank Clair Stadium in 1967
- Machinery Hall - built c. 1888 was replaced in 1920 (which burned down in 1944)
- Bandstand - built c. 1880s burned down in 1907 and replacement torn down for Frank Clair Stadium in 1967
- Press Building - built 1920
- General Purpose Building - built 1944 and later became curling rink 1961; it was demolished in the 1990s
- McElroy Building - built 1957 and became curling rink in 1963; it was demolished in the 1990s
- Manufacturers Annex - built 1953; it was demolished in the 1990s
- Pure Food Building - built 1955; it was demolished in the 1990s
- Demonstration Building - torn down for Frank Clair Stadium in 1967

With the re-development of Lansdowne Park, most of the remaining structures were demolished after 2012. SuperEx would not have become a tenant in the new development and would have needed to relocate. It was announced in December 2015 that the Ottawa SuperEX board had disbanded a year earlier and the Ex would not be returning.

== Midway ==
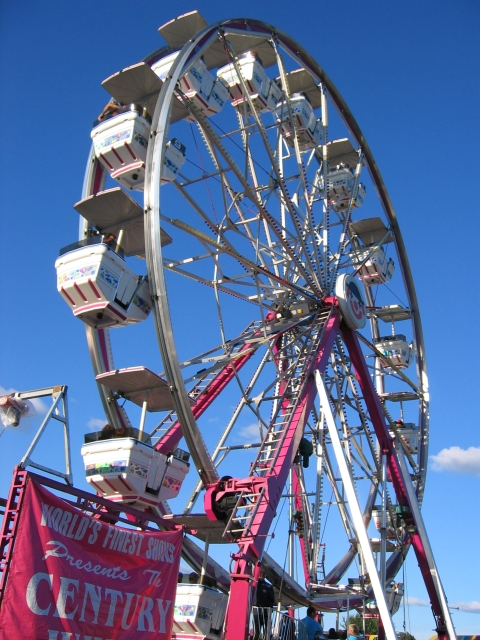
Century Wheel.

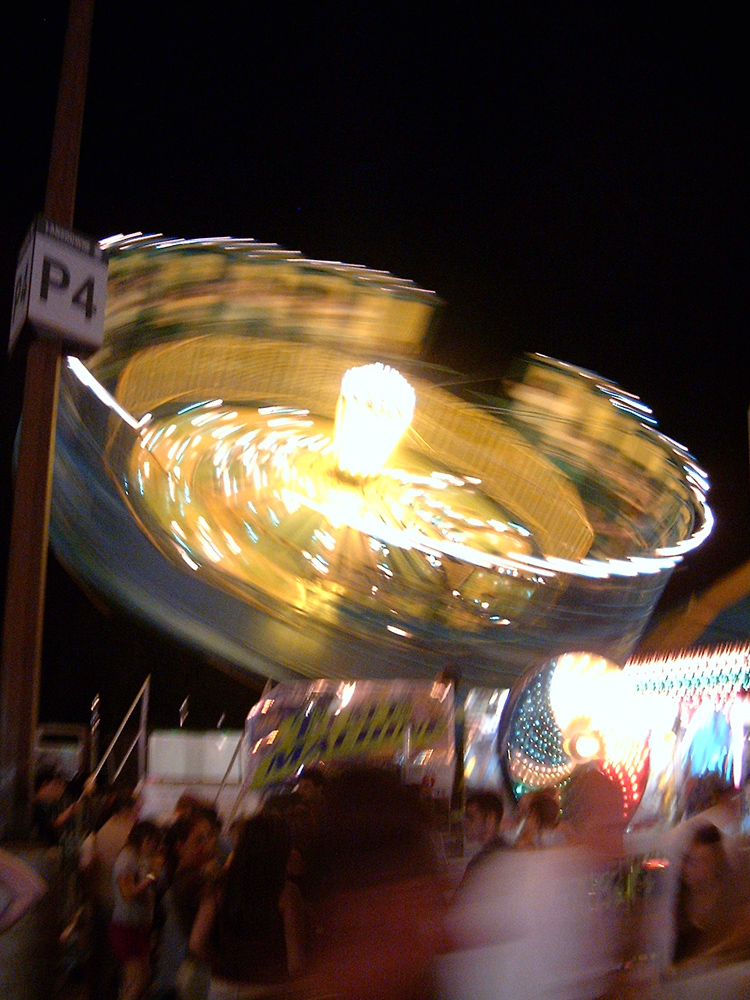
Time Machine ride at the 2005 exhibition.

A highlight of the annual fair were the 'thrill rides.' These were set up on site by the rides provider, and dismantled after the fair is over. Ride safety was monitored by the Technical Safety Standards Authority of Ontario. From 1997 to 2010, World's Finest Shows, the former Conklin Shows of Brantford, Ontario, provided rides along with Campbell Amusements and Homeniuk Amusements. Prior to 1997 Amusements of America and World of Mirth Shows provided the midway.

Rides were offered since the first year of the fair.

=== Accident ===
In August 1998, Jerome Charron, recent graduate of École Secondaire Publique Charlebois, died in a reverse bungee ride accident at the Ottawa Exhibition when he was hurled 40 meters into the air before plummeting to his death after his harness detached. In February 2000, the firm responsible for the ride, Anderson Ventures, was fined $145,000 for this incident. Provincial inspectors had inspected the ride just 4 days before the incident and had approved it.

=== Ottawa Midway Magic and the Capital Fair ===
While no fair or exhibits were held in 2011, 2012 and 2013, the former midway provider for SuperEx set up an annual midway of rides during the August time frame of SuperEx, called "Ottawa Midway Magic." In 2011, it was held in the parking lot at Ottawa's baseball stadium. In 2012 and 2013, it was held at grounds adjacent to Rideau Carleton Raceway. In 2014, Ottawa Midway Magic was retired and the original occupant at the Raceway, the annual 4 day Gloucester Fair moved from early June into the SuperEx's 10 day August time slot. To reflect the expansion it was renamed "the Capital Fair".

== Concerts ==
The Ottawa SuperEX attracted many musical performances. Stages included the Chez Stage, the Pizza Pizza Stage, the Direct Energy Pure Country Pavilion, the Giant Tiger stage and the SUPER Stage.

In 2005, the Solo Mobile / Eckored tour stopped at Lansdowne Park on August 25 to perform at the Ottawa SuperEX. It featured four solo female singers: Keshia Chanté, Amanda Stott, Christine Evans and Cassie Steele. They played on the SUPER Stage at 20h, and the concert was included at no extra charge with the SuperEX admission.

Hedley, Massari and other artists performed at SuperEX in 2006. Like the Keshia Chanté concert, only an admission to SuperEX was required to attend the concert.

While The Rolling Stones played at the Frank Clair Stadium during the SuperEX of 2005, the show required a separate ticket. The "Weird Al" Yankovic concert on August 22 took place in the Ottawa Civic Centre and also required a separate admission, as did other concerts over the latter years.

== See also ==
Other Canadian annual fairs (not a complete list)

- Carp Fair - Carp, Ontario
- Calgary Stampede - Calgary
- Canadian National Exhibition - Toronto
- Canadian Lakehead Exhibition - Thunder Bay
- Edmonton K-Days - Edmonton
- Expo Québec - Québec
- Markham Fair - Markham, Ontario
- Pacific National Exhibition - Vancouver
- Red River Exhibition - Winnipeg
- Royal Agricultural Winter Fair - Toronto
- Royal Manitoba Winter Fair - Brandon, Manitoba
- Schomberg Fair - Schomberg, Ontario
- Sooke Fall Fair - Sooke, British Columbia
- Streetsville Bread and Honey Festival - Mississauga
- Western Fair - London, Ontario
