= ExpoCité =

Coordinates: 46°49′41″N 71°14′49″W

- Type: Exposition grounds
- Location: 250, fr:boulevard Wilfrid-Hamel; Québec City; Quebec G1L 5A7
- Area: 92 acres (37 ha)
- Created: 1898

ExpoCité (formerly Parc de l'Exposition) is a multi-site entertainment complex located in the borough of La Cité-Limoilou, in downtown Quebec City. This is also the name of the corporation authorized by the City of Quebec to administer the site. ExpoCité was best known for Expo Québec an annual 12-day exhibition held in August but folded in 2016. The Salon de l'Auto de Québec (Quebec City Auto Show) is held there each March.

== Facilities ==
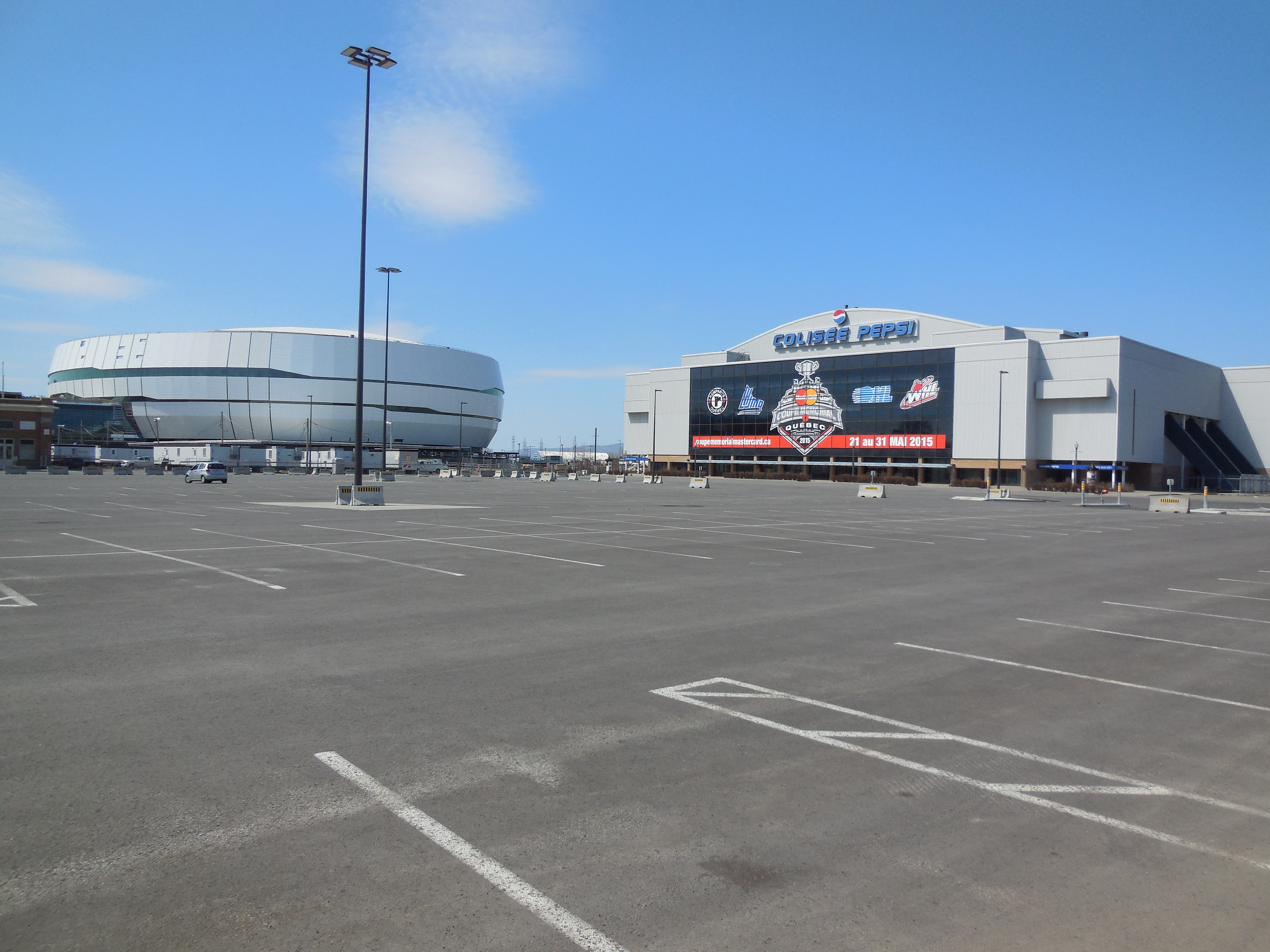
Colisée Pepsi and the Videotron Centre

- Videotron Centre, a large multipurpose arena
- Colisée Pepsi, a large multipurpose arena
- Pavillon Guy-Lafleur, a multipurpose arena
- Centre de foires de Québec, an exhibition space
- Pavillon de l'industrie et du commerce
- Pavillon des Arts
- Karting Extrême, an indoor go-kart track

== Grand Prix de Québec ==
From 1977 to 1979 the Parc de l'Exposition hosted the Grand Prix Labatt de Québec featuring rounds of the Formula Atlantic Labatt Championship Series. The races featured future driving stars Gilles Villeneuve, Bobby Rahal, Keke Rosberg and Danny Sullivan.

The races took place on a 2.03 km (1.26 miles), 12 turn temporary street circuit around the Colisée, the Hippodrome and the Pavillon de l'industrie et du commerce.

The Grand Prix weekends also featured Formula Ford, Honda BF Goodrich Challenge Series and production sportscar races.

Year	Date	Laps	Driver	Car
1977	Sept 25	80	(Canada) Gilles Villeneuve	March 77B
1978	June 11	80	(Sweden) Keke Rosberg	Chevron B45
1979	June 10	80	(United States) Kevin Cogan	Ralt RT-1
