= Markham Village =

- Neighbourhood; Former town centre
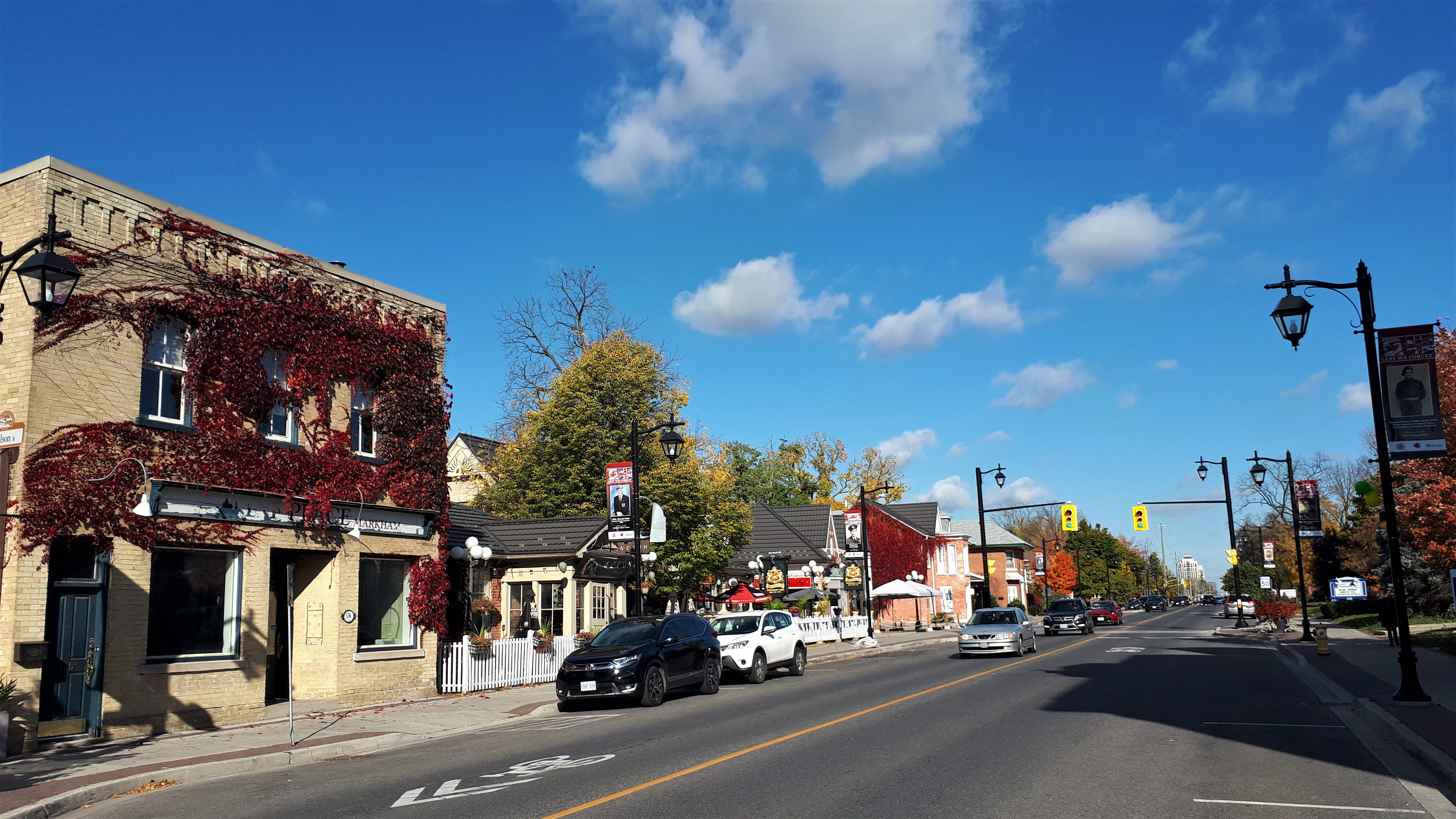
- Main Street Markham in Markham Village

- Location of Markham Village within Markham
- Coordinates: 43°52′36″N 79°15′37″W
- Country: Canada
- Province: Ontario
- Regional Municipality: York
- City: Markham
- Established: 1931 (as police village) - merged with Unionville, Buttonville and Thornhill to form Town of Markham in 1971

Area
  - Total: 3.32 km^{2} (1.28 sq mi)

Population (2006) Census Tract Number 5350400.07 / 5350400.08
  - Total: 6,090
  - Density: 1,834.34/km^{2} (4,750.9/sq mi)

Markham Village (2006 population 6,090) is the historic town centre of Markham, Ontario, Canada. Originally settled in 1825, the village, which was originally named Reesorville (in reference to the Reesor family of settlers) sometime after 1804 and also known as Mannheim (likely after Mannheim, Germany), was founded by Mennonites from Upstate New York and Pennsylvania. Eventually, as Upper Canada (now Ontario) started to experience immigration from the British Isles, Markham would experience significant growth. By 1825, the name "Markham" was established as the permanent name. In 1850, it was established as a police village, and in 1873 was fully incorporated as a village within York County. Markham was amalgamated with the surrounding Markham Township, which included the villages of Unionville and Thornhill in 1971, and incorporated as a town.

As the name implies, Markham Village was the city's original downtown. It was also the only small historic urban village within an amalgamated suburban city in the Greater Toronto Area well offset from the centre of its present municipality and not being the obvious core to have its status as the official downtown. However, being small and becoming largely relegated to being a community node near the far eastern part of the amalgamated municipality's urban area as development progressed over the years, that changed when the city decided a larger, more centrally located downtown was needed. The new downtown began development in the early 2010s southwest of Unionville.

== Population ==
As of 2011, Markham Village has a population of 3397 compared to 3418 in 2006 (Census/NHS 2011, Census 2006). This decrease in population is likely due to aging demographics and the lack of major new developments in the area.

== Markham Village Community Centre ==
Markham Village Community Centre and Arena
- Interactive map of Markham Village Community Centre and Arena
- Location: 6041 Highway 7 East, Markham, Ontario
- Owner: City of Markham
- Operator: City of Markham
- Capacity: Ice hockey 450

Construction
- Opened: 1960s

Markham Village Community Centre is located on the southeast corner of Main Street Markham and Highway 7 (originally named Wellington Street). It was the former site of the Markham Fair and (William Armstrong's and later Robert Goodfellow Armstrong's) Wellington Hotel. The community centre features a library (c. 1981 and renovated 2009), community rooms (above rink) and indoor ice rink (c. 1963 with rink seating for 450 originally for hockey and now home to skating club). and drop off recycling centre. The community centre is configured on a north-south axis, where as the old Agricultural Hall was east-west with much of it now occupied by the current day parking lot.

== Veterans Square and Cenotaph ==
In the southwest corner of Main Street Markham and Highway 7 is the Markham Cenotaph. The area is used for annual Remembrance Day ceremonies.

Built in 1981 by Phillip Carter, the current memorial was re-vamped (2017-2018) with a new Veterans Square and Cenotaph which features an obelisk-like cenotaph and dedicated to the men and women who fought for Canada's freedom. An earlier memorial by Rebecca Sisler (c. 1967) was moved indoors into the community centre in 1996.

== Events ==
Events and activities are organized by the Main Street Markham BIA. They organize events along Main Street between Bullock and Highway 7 and are stationed on 132 Robinson Street.

=== Main Street Markham Farmers Market ===
From early May to early October a farmers market is set up on the parking lot of Robinson Street just west of Main Street. The market features local products and live entertainment and runs every Saturday from 8am to 1pm from May to October.

=== Festival Of Lights ===
The Festival of Lights happens on the last Friday of November and the event runs from 5:30-11:00pm on Main Street. There is outdoor skating, live musical entertainment and fireworks.

=== Santa Claus Parade ===
Markham Santa Claus Parade has been held in Markham Village in the month of November since 1972, right after the Festival of Lights. The parade route begins just east of Main Street on Highway 7 and runs north along Main Street to 16th Avenue. The parade is hosted by Rotary Club of Markham and Markham-Unionville Rotary Club. The parade was cancelled in 2020 and 2021, during the COVID-19 pandemic.

== Education ==
Markham Village is home to one of York Region's oldest schools. Opened as SS #17 in 1846 (later as SS #15), it became Markham Village Public School in 1886 and currently as Franklin Street Public School since early 1960s.

== Transportation ==
Public transit options are mostly limited by major arterial roads serving Markham Village:

- Highway 7 - York Region Transit Route 1 Highway 7 (East) and Viva Purple
- 16th Avenue - YRT Route 16 16th Avenue, 41 Markham Local, 301 Brother Andre C.H.S.
- Main Street - Toronto Transit Commission Route 102D Markham Rd. with limited stops along the route

There are two routes limited service bus routes with fewer than 15 buses a day:

- YRT Route 301 Markham Express - runs partially on 16th Avenue and Main Street with rest of route on side streets
- YRT Route 522 Markham Local - runs locally parallelling and following Highway 7

Three routes provides transit to students during school year with limited runs weekdays in the morning and afternoon:

- YRT Route 406 - routing on side streets in Markham Village
- YRT Route 410 - routing partially on 16th Avenue and rest on side streets within and beyond Markham Village
- YRT Route 411 Markham District H.S. - route on side streets to the east of Main Street and bypassing 16th Avenue and Highway 7

Markham GO Station is the only stop on the Stouffville line within Markham Village. GO bus routes 54, 70A, 70C, 71C, 71E also has limited service to the station.

== Markville ==
The area between just east of Kennedy Road to just west of Robinson Creek/Main Street Markham is referred to as Markville or Raymerville – Markville East. It is not formally recognized by the City nor in most maps and included as informally within Markham Village.
