= Expo Québec =

Expo Québec was an annual fair that took place in Quebec City in mid to late August from 1897 to 2015.

== History ==
The first exposition began in 1854, the first full exhibition began after the establishment of the Québec City Provincial Exhibition Company in 1892.

The exposition site, now referred to as ExpoCité, had including a 1,000-seat stadium, racetrack and mostly agricultural theme. In 1913 a midway and roller coaster was added making it common with most modern fall fairs.

== Demise ==
In early 2016 the City of Quebec announced that Expo Québec would not return in 2016 and the site next to Videotron Centre (once the race track site) would be re-developed mirroring the collapse of the Ottawa SuperEX in Ottawa, Ontario in 2011. The former Colisée Pepsi closed in 2015 and is also expected to be demolished.

== See also ==
Other remaining expositions in Quebec include:

- Expo agricole de La Matapédia - Bas-Saint-Laurent
- Exposition Agricole de Beauce - Chaudière-Appalaches
- Huntingdon Fair - Montérégie
- Ayer's Cliff Fair - Estrie
- Exposition agricole régionale d'Abitibi - Abitibi-Témiscamingue
- Expo Richmond Fair - Cleveland Richmond/Estrie
