= Kirkendall =

Kirkendall is a surname. Notable people with the surname include:

- Ernest Kirkendall (1914–2005), American chemist and metallurgist known for the Kirkendall effect at metal–metal interfaces
- Ira M. Kirkendall, American politician, first mayor of Wilkes-Barre, Pennsylvania
- Nancy Kirkendall, American government statistician
- Thomas Kirkendall, American politician, defendant in tax law case Quong Wing v. Kirkendall
