= Royal Manitoba Winter Fair =

Annual agricultural fair in Brandon, Manitoba, Canada

- Genre: Winter agricultural fair
- Date: Late March
- Frequency: Annual
- Location: Brandon, Manitoba
- Years active: 117
- Attendance: 50,000 (2026)
- Website: provincialexhibition.com/rmwfhomepage

Royal Manitoba Winter Fair (RMWF) is an annual agricultural fair near the end of March, hosted by the Provincial Exhibition of Manitoba in the Keystone Centre in Brandon, Manitoba, Canada. The largest event held in Brandon, and one of the largest agricultural events in Western Canada, it attracts up to 50,000 attendees each year as of 2026. The RMWF is traditionally held each year during Manitoba's academic spring break. The RMWF initially started and a horse and cattle show in 1909, before growing into the large comprehensive event it is today. This initial event in 1909 was held primarily to promote the sale of livestock improve breeding stock and care of animals. In 1970, it received royal patronage from Queen Elizabeth II, and is one of only two fairs in Canada with royal patronage. Events at fair include show jumping and heavy horse competitions, livestock sales and displays, ahands-on agricultural awareness programs, exhibits and entertainment. There were cancellations in 1917–18, 1942–45 & 2020–21.

== See also ==
- Canadian National Exhibition
- Calgary Stampede
- Canadian Lakehead Exhibition
- Central Canada Exhibition
- Pacific National Exhibition
- Red River Exhibition
- Royal Agricultural Winter Fair
