= Schomberg, Ontario =

Schomberg
- Unincorporated community
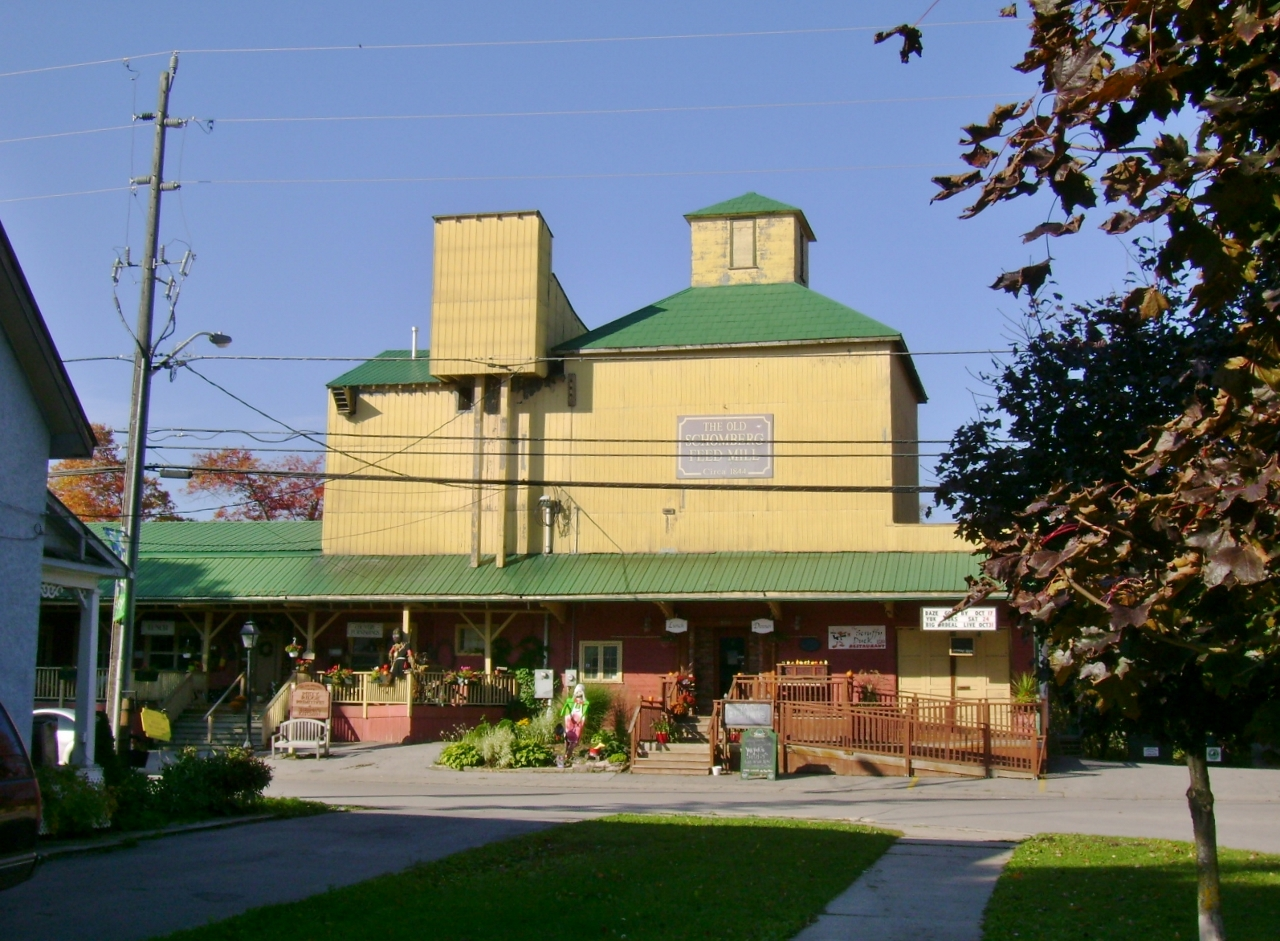
- Old Schomberg Feed Mill (1884)

- Location within Canada Location within Ontario Location within North America
- Coordinates: 44°00′12″N 79°41′06″W
- Country: Canada
- Province: Ontario
- Regional municipality: York Region
- Township: King

Government
  - Township mayor: Steve Pellegrini
  - Councillor: Mary Asselstine (Ward 4)
  - MP: Deb Schulte
  - MPP: Stephen Lecce

Area
  - Land: 2.39 km^{2} (0.92 sq mi)
- Elevation: 200 m (660 ft)

Population (2021)
  - Total: 2,656
  - Density: 1,111.8/km^{2} (2,880/sq mi)
- Demonym: Schomberger or Schombergian
- Time zone: UTC−5 (EST)
  - Summer (DST): UTC−4 (EDT)
- Forward sortation area: L0G
- Area codes: 905, 289, 365, and 742
- NTS Map: 31D4 Alliston
- Website: www.schomberg.ca

Schomberg (2021 population 2,656) is an unincorporated village in northwestern King, Ontario, Canada. It is located north of the Oak Ridges Moraine and south of the Holland River.

Schomberg is accessed via Highway 9, which links Orangeville and Newmarket; via Highway 27 linking Barrie and Toronto; and the Lloydtown-Aurora Road. Its main street is York Regional Road 76, a curved avenue separate from the local major highways.

== History ==
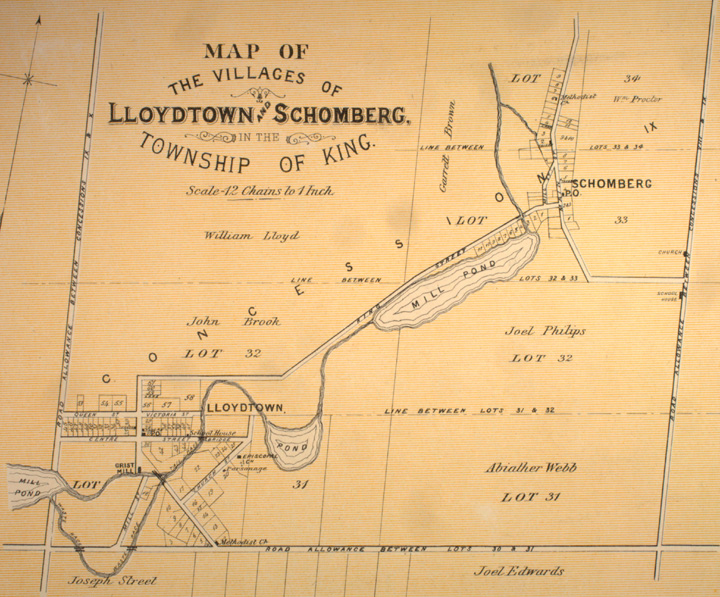
Map from 1878 showing lots 30–34 in King Township, including the communities of Schomberg and Lloydtown

Brownsville was founded by Irish settlers who had immigrated to Canada from Pennsylvania in the United States. It was named for its founder, businessman Thomas Brown (born 13 May 1802), who was one of twelve siblings born in Pennsylvania, and one of four who emigrated to Upper Canada. About 1830, his farmer brother John R. Brown (born 3 June 1811) settled on lot 26, concession 8, establishing the rural community. Thomas built the community's only flour mill in 1836, stimulating development. The mill was eventually bought by their brother Garrett, who also established the first bank in the community. For postal service, residents used the post office in the nearby community of Lloydtown.

In 1861, the community applied for a post office, but was rejected because another post office with the name Brownsville was already in operation in York County. (That community is now part of Woodbridge in Vaughan.) In 1862, the community was renamed Schomberg, a name suggested by Thomas Roberts Ferguson, and its post office was established. The name was likely for The 3rd Duke of Schomberg and 1st Duke of Leinster, K.G. (1641–1719), a general under King William III of England.

On 6 June 1890, the town was one of many flooded as a result of a storm in the eastern United States and Canada. The flood destroyed buildings, leaving many residents homeless and businesses ruined, and swept away two mill dams. It also carried one building downstream, where it came to rest on a farm. In Ontario, the storm also caused flooding in Barrie, Brooklin, Greenwood, and Orangeville.

On 25 March 1899, the community was established as a police village. In 1902, the Traders Bank of Canada (now part of the Royal Bank of Canada) established the first commercial bank in Schomberg, and in January 1920 the Imperial Bank of Canada (now part of the Canadian Imperial Bank of Commerce) established a branch.

For some time in the early 20th century, the town was the terminus of the Schomberg and Aurora Railway that connected to the Toronto and York Radial Railway on Yonge Street, some distance to the east. The railway was constructed to bring shoppers and day-trippers from Toronto to the town, but was never very popular. Opened for traffic in 1902, it was electrified in 1916 and closed in 1927. The rails were removed the next year, but the right of way can still be seen to the east of the town.

Urbanization of the community occurred primarily in the southwestern part, with small developments. In the 1950s and 1960s, housing was developed near the centre, and in the 1990s in the Roselena Drive area. Two developments in the 2010s added 147 detached homes, 52 semi-detached homes, 29 townhouses, and a 127-unit six-storey condominium.

=== Climate ===
Schomberg has a continental climate moderated by the Great Lakes and influenced by warm, moist air masses from the south, and cold, dry air from the north. The Oak Ridges Moraine affects levels of precipitation: as an air mass arrives from Lake Ontario and reaches the elevated ground surface of the moraine, it rises causing precipitation.

Climate data for Schomberg (1981–2010 normals)
Month	Jan	Feb	Mar	Apr	May	Jun	Jul	Aug	Sep	Oct	Nov	Dec	Year
Record high °C (°F)	13.0 (55.4)	14.5 (58.1)	24.0 (75.2)	30.0 (86.0)	32.5 (90.5)	35.5 (95.9)	36.0 (96.8)	35.6 (96.1)	33.0 (91.4)	27.0 (80.6)	24.0 (75.2)	20.0 (68.0)	36.0 (96.8)
Mean daily maximum °C (°F)	−3.0 (26.6)	−1.8 (28.8)	3.1 (37.6)	11.2 (52.2)	18.4 (65.1)	23.7 (74.7)	26.3 (79.3)	25.0 (77.0)	20.2 (68.4)	13.5 (56.3)	5.8 (42.4)	−0.1 (31.8)	11.9 (53.4)
Daily mean °C (°F)	−6.9 (19.6)	−5.9 (21.4)	−1.2 (29.8)	6.3 (43.3)	12.4 (54.3)	17.6 (63.7)	20.2 (68.4)	19.0 (66.2)	14.7 (58.5)	8.6 (47.5)	2.4 (36.3)	−3.4 (25.9)	7.0 (44.6)
Mean daily minimum °C (°F)	−10.9 (12.4)	−10.0 (14.0)	−5.6 (21.9)	1.3 (34.3)	6.4 (43.5)	11.5 (52.7)	14.0 (57.2)	13.1 (55.6)	9.1 (48.4)	3.7 (38.7)	−1.1 (30.0)	−6.6 (20.1)	2.1 (35.8)
Record low °C (°F)	−36.0 (−32.8)	−33.0 (−27.4)	−29.0 (−20.2)	−14.0 (6.8)	−4.0 (24.8)	−2.0 (28.4)	2.5 (36.5)	0.5 (32.9)	−6.5 (20.3)	−8.9 (16.0)	−22.0 (−7.6)	−31.5 (−24.7)	−36.0 (−32.8)
Average precipitation mm (inches)	52.9 (2.08)	47.9 (1.89)	52.3 (2.06)	59.9 (2.36)	72.8 (2.87)	79.8 (3.14)	85.1 (3.35)	89.7 (3.53)	81.7 (3.22)	69.7 (2.74)	72.4 (2.85)	52.1 (2.05)	816.1 (32.13)
Average snowfall cm (inches)	33.3 (13.1)	25.7 (10.1)	19.2 (7.6)	4.2 (1.7)	0.0 (0.0)	0.0 (0.0)	0.0 (0.0)	0.0 (0.0)	0.0 (0.0)	1.6 (0.6)	13.3 (5.2)	27.8 (10.9)	125.1 (49.3)
Average precipitation days	12.2	9.4	9.6	11.8	11.9	10.9	9.9	11.3	12.7	13.1	12.2	10.1	135.0
Source: Environment Canada

== Demographics ==
As of the 2021 census, the top three ethnic groups in Schomberg are Italian (810; 31.2%), English (560; 21.5%) and Scottish (450; 17.3%).

== Culture ==
An annual tradition is the Schomberg Fair, first held in 1852. It is an agricultural fair featuring a variety of events and activities. It is held every year on the last weekend in May. The fairgrounds are located at the corner of Ontario Highway 9 and York Regional Road 27 (former section of Ontario Highway 27)

A more recent annual tradition is Main Street Christmas. This is held one evening in December, during which people celebrate the holiday season by listening to carols, going on hay rides, and viewing ice sculptures, among other things.

Schomberg is home to the Schomberg Cougars, a Junior C hockey team playing in the Georgian Mid-Ontario Junior C Hockey League. The Schomberg Minor Hockey Association and the Schomberg Cougars are tenants of the Trisan Centre.

The largest inuksuk is located at Allstone Quarry on Highway 27 north of 18th Sideroad in Schomberg. It was built by a local stone quarry as an attraction for commerce.

== Education ==
Schomberg has two elementary schools: Schomberg Public School and St. Patrick's Catholic School. There is also a nursery school. There is no secondary school in Schomberg, so students generally attend King City Secondary School, Cardinal Carter Catholic High School, Aurora High School, or St. Maximillian Kolbe Catholic High School.

== Notable residents ==
- Paul Volpe (1927–1983), mobster
- Adam Oates, NHL player
- Darryl Bootland, NHL player
- Mike Kitchen, NHL player
- Bill Kitchen (1960–2012), ice hockey
- Cam Woolley, police officer
- Eric Lamaze, equestrian
- Beth Underhill, equestrian

== Filming locations ==
- The 1970 Canadian film, Homer, starring Don Scardino and Ralph Endersby, was shot mainly in downtown Schomberg. In the film, the characters referred to the fictional town as "Schomberg, Wisconsin."
- The television series La Femme Nikita used Schomberg as a stand-in for a fictional town in the American South called "Dingman's Hollow" that was later revealed to be an enemy sleeper base.
- Several other motion pictures have been shot in Schomberg and surrounding areas.
