= Schomberg Fair =

Agricultural fair

- Genre: Spring agricultural fair
- Dates: Thursday after Victoria Day to Sunday
- Location: Schomberg, Ontario
- Years active: 174 years
- Founded: 1852
- Website: www.schombergfair.com

The Schomberg Fair is an annual agricultural fair held in late May in Schomberg, a community in the township of King in Ontario, Canada. It starts on the Thursday following Victoria Day, and runs through to Sunday. It is staged at the Schomberg Agricultural Fairgrounds, also known as the Schomberg Fairgrounds, which is adjacent to the Holland River.

In 1852, the Township of King established the annual King Township Fall Fair, which was held in one of the communities of Aurora, Kettleby, King City, Laskay, Nobleton, or Schomberg. In 1872, a permanent location was selected, and the fair renamed The Schomberg Agricultural Fair, and the Schomberg Agricultural Society was organized to operate it. Agricultural land was purchased adjacent to the community to be the site of the fair.

The fair has expanded beyond simply an agricultural showcase, and now includes numerous activities.

No fair was held between 1917 and 1918 nor 1942–45. The 2020 fair was cancelled as a result of the COVID-19 pandemic in Ontario.

From 2012 to 2020, the fair board tried to attract a dwindling host of volunteers and saw most of its representatives come from outside the local community. Currently, there are no active board members who live within the King Township municipality or who are active farmers in the host municipality.

The former arena on the north end of the fairgrounds houses the Parks, Recreation and Culture department of the municipal government of King.

== Events ==
On Thursday, attendees can pay one price to ride the midway rides as many times as they wish. On holidays, they may also pay a special price which will allow up to four people to enjoy the rides.

Friday is the official start day of the fair. In the evening there is an opening ceremony followed by the demolition derby, the fair's most popular event.

On Saturday morning a parade is held on the main street of Schomberg. The procession consists of local organizations and bands followed by the winning car from the previous night's derby. After the parade the doors to the Schomberg arena are opened. For the duration of the fair the arena will house art and craft as well as agricultural displays.

Sunday is family fun day at the Schomberg fair. This includes a variety of family oriented events such as the baby show and the relative look alike contest.
