= Royal Agricultural Winter Fair =

Annual agricultural fair in Toronto

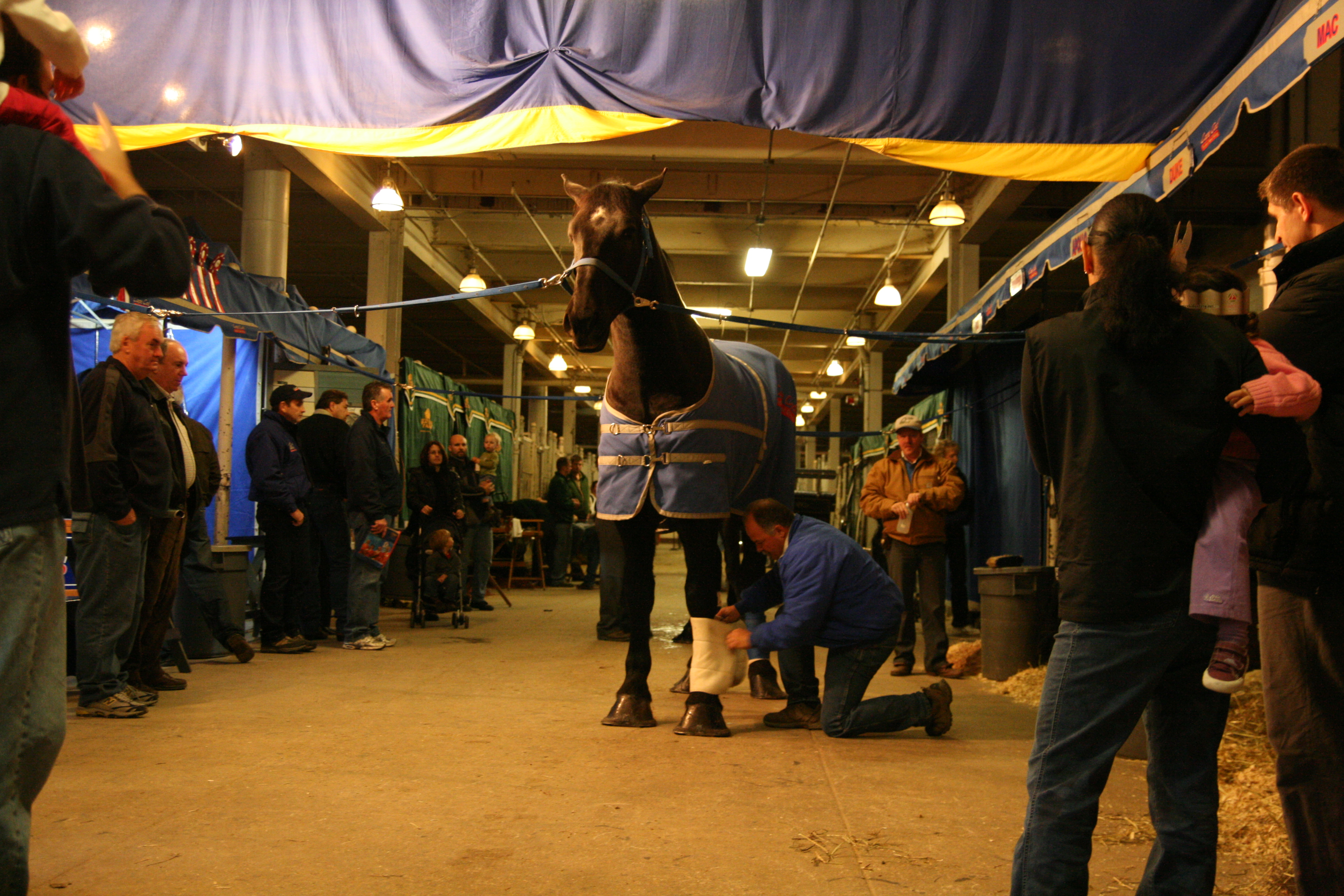
- A lineup of horses being polished and wrapped backstage for the show at the Royal Agricultural Winter Fair, November 2008
- Genre: Winter agricultural fair
- Dates: Early November
- Locations: Exhibition Place, Toronto, Ontario
- Founded: 1922
- Website: www.royalfair.org

The Royal Agricultural Winter Fair (RAWF), also known as The Royal, is an annual agricultural fair that is held in Toronto, Ontario, Canada during the first two weeks of November. It was inaugurated in 1922 in the Coliseum, on the grounds of Exhibition Place. It has since been expanded to also take up the Enercare Centre and remains an important exhibit for livestock breeders. Elizabeth II, as Queen of Canada, was the fair's royal patron. Members of the Canadian Royal Family have also been guests of honour at the fair. It is the largest indoor agricultural fair in the world.

== History ==
Cover for the 1923 Fair programme.

Following the First World War, a group of farmers led by W. A. Dryden, from Brooklin, Ontario, sought to create a national agricultural exhibition, partly to set national standards for the judging of domestic animals. Together, they formed the Agricultural Winter Fair Association of Canada and quickly received, in 1920, permission from King George V for use of the prefix royal.

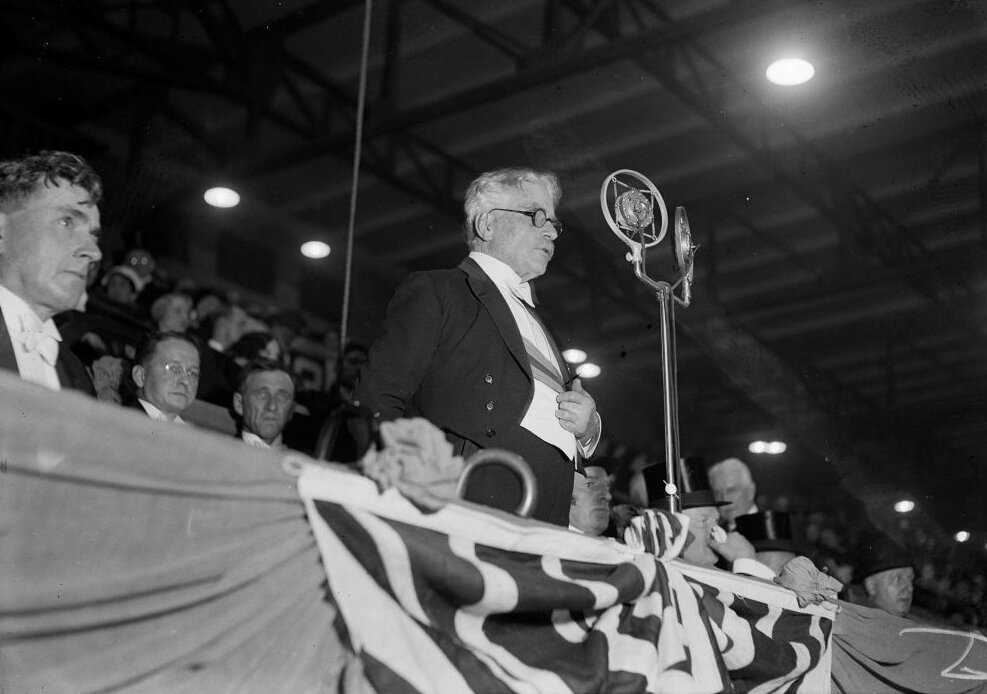
Former prime minister Robert Borden speaking at the fair, November 1930.

In 1920, the City of Toronto approved the construction of a new livestock arena on the Toronto Exhibition Grounds to house the new fair and other uses. Plans called for the first mounting of the Royal Agricultural Winter Fair to take place in 1921, but this was delayed when a heating system for the new arena could not be installed in time. The first show thus opened on 22 November 1922, drawing to its livestock competitions 17,000 entries from several provinces and the United States. The fair then, save for the years when Canada was embroiled in the Second World War, consistently provided for farmers a forum to display equipment, discuss new trends, and showcase wares. In 1965, significant changes were introduced by the federal Department of Agriculture, which had been a longtime sponsor of The Royal. Both the number of livestock classes for each breed and the number of entries per breeder were reduced; new judging standards were set, emphasizing the utility of the breed; buildings were renovated, and the Winter Garden Show and Horse Show were given more prominence, the latter attracting some 75,000 viewers.

For the fair's 75th anniversary in 1997 a commemorative stamp was issued by Canada Post.

Due to the COVID-19 pandemic, the 2020 and 2021 editions of the Royal Agricultural Winter Fair in Toronto were cancelled, as was the case for that summer's Canadian National Exhibition and the Canadian International Air Show, also held at Exhibition Place.

== Programme ==
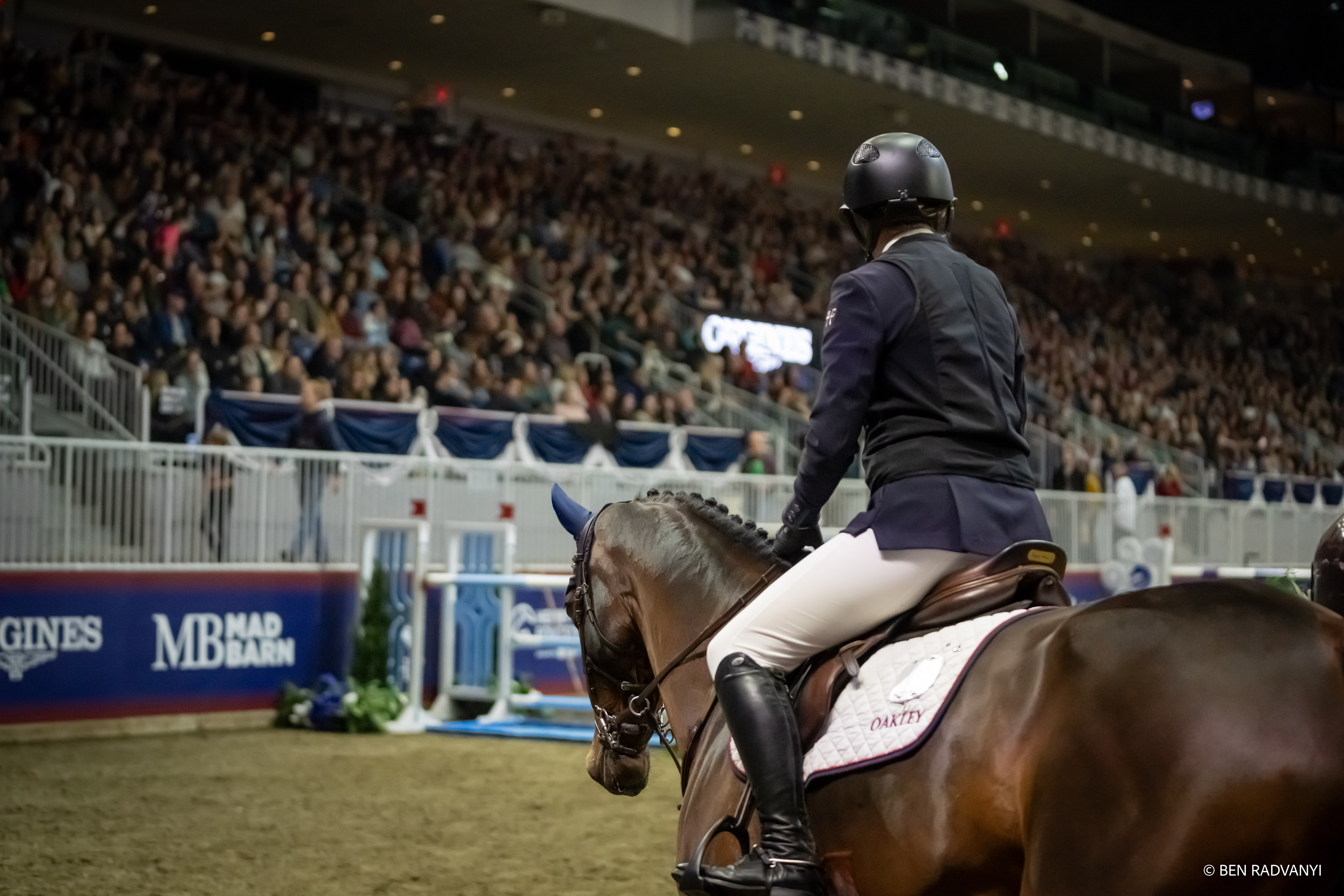
The Iconic Royal Horse Show has been a centerpiece of The Royal since its inception.

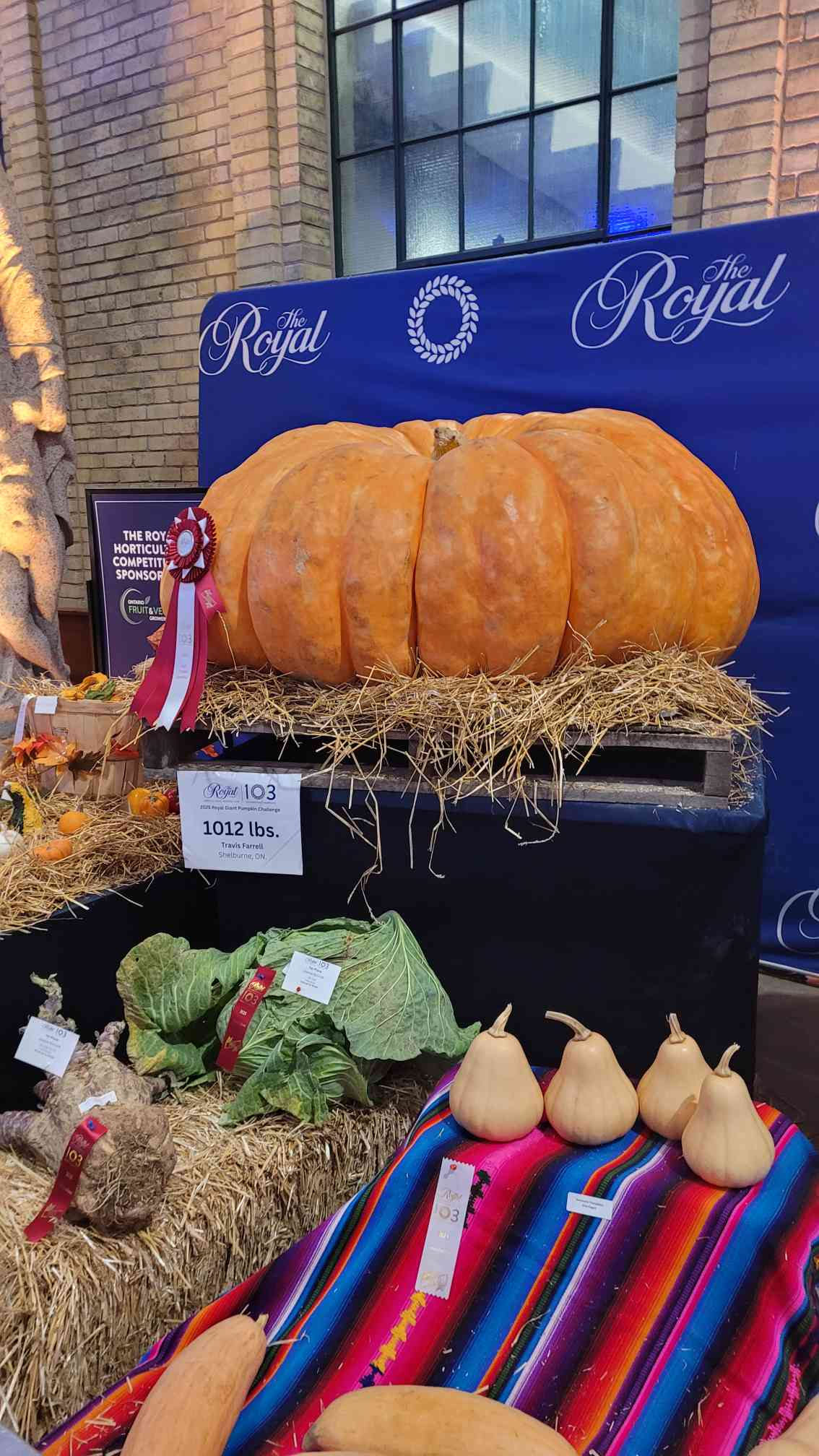
Horticultural competition at the 2025 fair

Today, the Royal Agricultural Winter Fair sees over 320,000 visits including exhibitors, and international and local guests of all ages. Over 6,000 animals arrive in Toronto each November, including over 4,900 head of cattle, sheep, goats, pigs, rabbits, and fancy bird, and over 900 horses and ponies, plus numerous displays of crops and vegetables, educational exhibits, and feature attractions. The latter include The Royal Culinary Academy, which provides demonstrations and interactive opportunities for the public, food sampling, along with other education and entertainment features each day and evening. Evening events at the Fair include the Royal Horse Show, dining in The Royal's food venues. Additionally, The Royal Animal Theatre showcases animals at work and play, including sheep-herding, goats on the go, Spirit of the Horse, rabbit jumping, and The SuperDogs. The Royal Horse Show features top international equestrians and has been a cornerstone of the fair since its inception.

== See also ==
- List of festivals in Canada
- List of festivals in Ontario
- List of festivals in Toronto
