= List of festivals in British Columbia =

Festivals of British Columbia
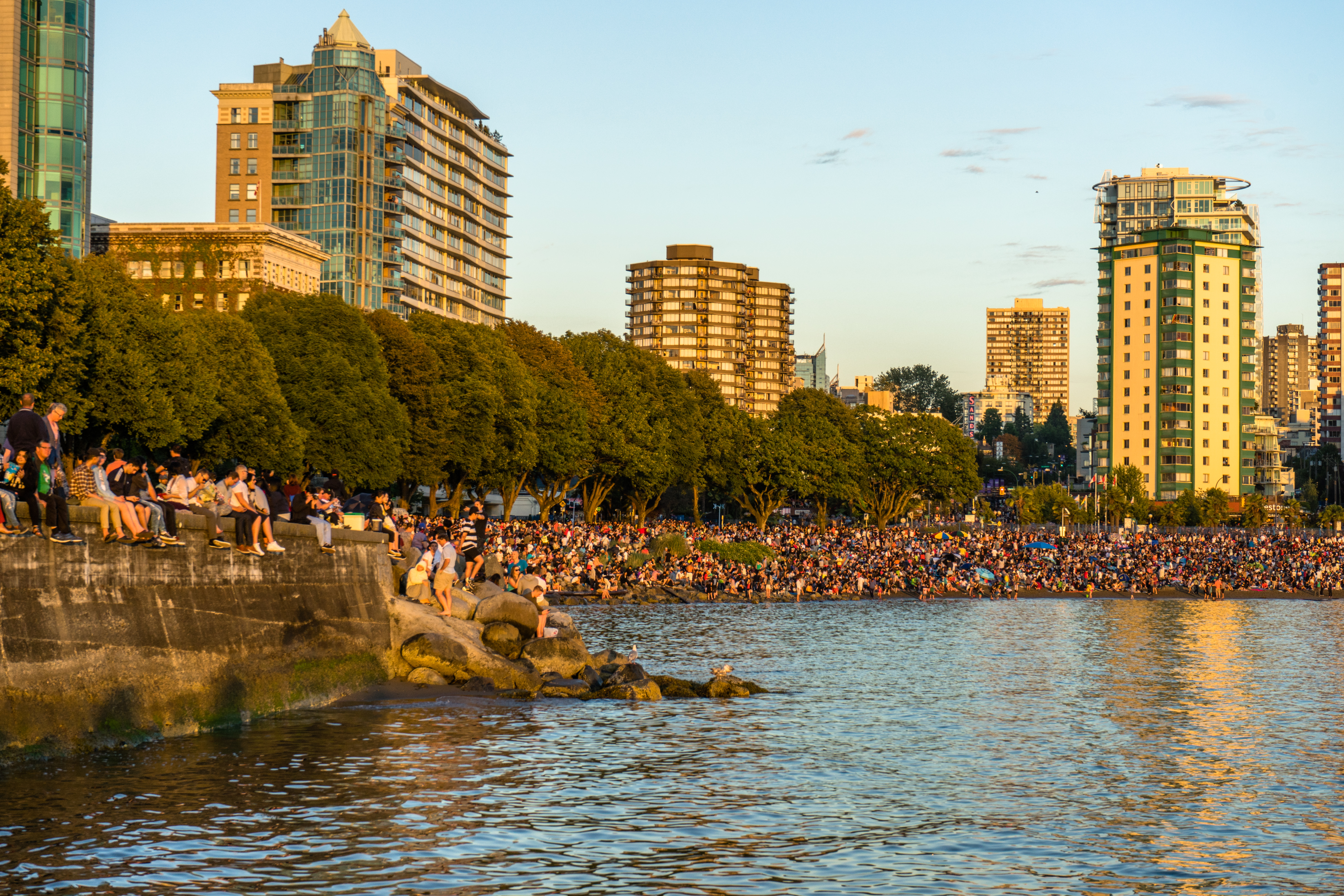

Related topics
- Festivals of Canada; lists of festivals by province or region (Alberta; Manitoba; Ontario; Quebec; Saskatchewan); culture of British Columbia; tourism in British Columbia

The following is an incomplete list of festivals in the province of British Columbia, Canada. Both single events and recurring festivals are included. This list includes festivals of diverse types, including regional festivals, commerce festivals, fairs, food festivals, arts festivals, religious festivals, folk festivals, and recurring festivals on holidays. A number of notable cultural and music festivals take place in British Columbia.

== List of festivals ==
- Ha Ha Ha Kidzfest, Penticton, BC
- Ignite the Arts Festival, Penticton, BC
- ArtsWELLS Festival of All Things Art
- Billy Barker Days
- Center of Gravity
- Hataw Pinoy Philippine Summer Festival
- Hyack Festival
- Under the Volcano Festival
- Canadian International Dragon Boat Festival
- Celebration of Light
- Crazy8s
- Gung Haggis Fat Choy
- Illuminares
- Interior Provincial Exhibition
- Kootenay Burlesque Festival
- Pacific National Exhibition
- Parade of Lost Souls
- Powell Street Festival
- PuSh International Performing Arts Festival
- Queer Arts Festival
- Terrace Riverboat Days
- Short Line Reading Series
- Symphony of Fire
- Vancouver Cherry Blossom Festival
- Vancouver Fringe Festival
- Vancouver Halloween Parade & Expo
- Vancouver International Burlesque Festival
- Vancouver International Dance Festival
- Vancouver International Digital Festival
- Vancouver International Sculpture Biennale
- Vancouver Pride Festival
- The Word on the Street (literary festival)

=== Food ===
- Dine Out Vancouver Festival
- Eat! Vancouver
- Fort Langley Cranberry Festival

=== Film and theatre ===
- Crazy8s
- DOXA Documentary Film Festival
- Victoria Film Festival
- Vancouver Asian Film Festival
- Vancouver International Film Festival
- Vancouver Queer Film Festival
- Whistler Film Festival

=== Music ===
- Performing Arts BC
- Rifflandia Music Festival
- Arts County Fair
- Festival du Bois
- Levitation (festival)
- Music Waste
- Vancouver International Jazz Festival
- Virgin Festival
- Water's Edge Festival
- Merritt Mountain Music Festival
- Mid-Summer Music Festival
- Motion Notion
- Nakusp Music Fest
- Rifflandia Music Festival
- Salmon Arm Roots and Blues Festival
- Vancouver Pop Festival
- Victoria Ska Fest
- World Ski and Snowboard Festival
- Bella Coola Music Festival, Bella Coola
- Merritt Mountain Music Festival, Merritt, British Columbia
- Shambhala, West Kootenay
- Squamish Valley Music Festival, Squamish
- Vancouver Folk Music Festival, Vancouver
- ValhallaFest, Terrace, British Columbia
- Victoria Ska Fest, Victoria
- Virgin Festival, Vancouver

== See also ==
- List of festivals in Canada
- Culture of British Columbia
- Tourism in British Columbia
