= List of festivals in Vancouver =

Related topics
- Festivals of Canada; festivals of British Columbia; lists of festivals by city (Calgary; Edmonton; Lethbridge; Montreal; Ottawa; Toronto; Winnipeg); Culture of Vancouver; Tourism in Vancouver

This is a list of festivals in Vancouver, British Columbia, Canada.

== Festivals ==
- Canadian International Dragon Boat Festival
- Parade of Lost Souls
- Queer Arts Festival
- Vancouver International Burlesque Festival
- Vancouver Cherry Blossom Festival
- Vancouver Pride Festival

=== Cultural festivals ===
- Gung Haggis Fat Choy - Scottish/Chinese festival

=== Dance festivals ===
- Vancouver International Dance Festival

=== Film & stage festivals ===
- Bard on the Beach
- DOXA Documentary Film Festival
- PuSh International Performing Arts Festival
- Sundar Prize Film Festival
- Vancouver Asian Film Festival
- Vancouver Fringe Festival
- Vancouver International Film Festival
- Vancouver Queer Film Festival

=== Fireworks & lights festivals ===
- Celebration of Light

=== Food & beverage festivals ===
- Eat! Vancouver

=== Music festivals ===
- Vancouver Folk Music Festival
- Vancouver International Jazz Festival

=== Pop culture festivals ===
- Vancouver Halloween Parade & Expo

== See also ==
- List of festivals in British Columbia
- List of festivals in Canada
