= Timeline of Vancouver history =

This is a timeline of the history of Vancouver.

== 18th century ==
- 1791 – José María Narváez explores the Strait of Georgia.
- 1792 – Captain George Vancouver spends one day on the site which, almost 100 years later, would bear his name. Captain Vancouver from England then took his ship, HMS Discovery, into Burrard Inlet.

== 19th century ==
- 1808 – Simon Fraser becomes the first European to reach the area overland, descending the river which bears his name.
- 1818 – Treaty of 1818
- 1827 – HBC Fort Langley established east of present-day Vancouver. Contact and trade began accelerating significantly, primarily with the Fraser River Salish.
- 1846 – The Oregon Treaty permanently established the 49th parallel as the boundary between the United States and British North America to the Pacific Ocean.
- 1858 – Colony of British Columbia established
- 1859 – New Westminster is named the capital of the Colony of British Columbia.
- 1866 – The Colony of British Columbia and Colony of Vancouver Island are united as the new Colony of British Columbia, with the capital at Victoria.
- 1867
  - Hastings Mill founded
  - Gassy Jack opens the first saloon to provide drinks to workers from the Hastings Mill. Gastown then builds up around this popular saloon.
  - Weekly stage service is established between the Brighton Hotel, a popular summer vacation spot which is located just west of the Second Narrows Bridge and New Westminster.
- 1869 – Gastown is surveyed as Granville Townsite.
- 1872 – Louis Gold is the first Jew among the merchants of newly emergent Gastown, opening a general store on the waterfront.
- 1885 – The last spike of the Canadian Pacific Railway (CPR) from Montreal to Vancouver is driven at Craigellachie, British Columbia.
- 1886
  - The Town of Granville is incorporated as the City of Vancouver (the name was chosen by the president of Canadian Pacific Railway). Rate-payers elect Malcolm Alexander MacLean, a real estate dealer, as the first mayor of Vancouver. The city has a population of about 1,000 people.
  - The Canadian Pacific Railway's first transcontinental train from Montreal arrives in Port Moody. The very first Granville Street Bridge was completed and then another bridge was built later in 1909.
  - Great Vancouver Fire
  - Vancouver General Hospital opened on Pender Street
  - Vancouver Police Department formed
  - Vancouver Rowing Club formed
- 1887
  - Vancouver Board of Trade incorporated
  - The Canadian Pacific Railway extends its line westward from the terminus at Port Moody to Vancouver.
  - Canadian Pacific Railway’s Engine 374 brings the first transcontinental train into Vancouver.
  - British mail liner SS Abyssinia arrives.
- 1888
  - Vancouver Daily World newspaper founded
  - Real estate board formed
  - Stanley Park opens.
- 1889 – The original Granville Street Bridge is completed.
- 1890 – The original Brockton Point Lighthouse is built. The current structure was built in 1914.
- 1892 – The Great Marpole Midden is excavated for its archeology by Charles Hill-Tout.
- 1897 – The Klondike Gold Rush boosts a continent-wide depression of the 1890s. By 1900, Vancouver displaces Victoria, the provincial capital, as the leading commercial centre on Canada's west coast.
- 1898
  - The 9 O'Clock Gun is placed at Brockton Point (it still signals the time by being discharged every evening at 9:00 p.m. precisely).
  - The Province newspaper founded
  - J. S. Matthews, later city archivist, settles in Vancouver.

== 20th century ==
- 1903 – Woodward's building constructed
- 1905 – Asiatic Exclusion League formed
- 1907 – Spencer's department store opened at Richards & Hastings (later Eaton's)
- 1908 – BC Legislature passes legislation establishing the University of British Columbia (UBC).
- 1909 – Industrial Workers of the World Local 45 (Lumber Workers) is chartered on December 29; it is one of the first lumber worker locals in the province.
- 1910
  - Construction of the city's first skyscraper, Dominion Building at Hastings and Cambie
  - The first Pacific National Exhibition is held in Hastings Park.
  - British Columbia Academy of Science begins meeting.
- 1911
  - Vancouver amalgamates with Hastings Townsite.
  - The Denman Arena, an artificial ice rink, opens to the public; it is home to the Vancouver Millionaires professional hockey club.
- 1913 – A worldwide depression lasts two years and severely reduces trade and slows railway development. Declining resources also end a provincial mining boom.
- 1914 – Komagata Maru incident
- 1915 – University of British Columbia (UBC) opens its Fairview district campus on the site of Vancouver General Hospital.
- 1916
  - Vancouver Technical Secondary School opened
  - Lost Lagoon transformed by the construction of the Stanley Park Causeway.
- 1918 – Vancouver general strike
- 1919 – Canadian National Railway station completed
- 1920 – Growth resumes and Vancouver soon replaces Winnipeg as the leading city in western Canada.
- 1923
  - Vancouver and District Waterfront Workers' Association established
  - Warren Harding visits Vancouver, becoming the first president of the United States to set foot on Canadian soil.
- 1925
  - The original Second Narrows Bridge opens, connecting the city with North Vancouver.
  - University of British Columbia (UBC) moves from Fairview to its permanent home in Point Grey.
- 1926 – The Orpheum Theatre opens to the public.
- 1927 – Charles Lindbergh refuses to include Vancouver in his North American tour because of the lack of a proper airport. Two years later, the city purchases land on Sea Island for aviation purposes; it is now the location of Vancouver International Airport.
- 1929 – Vancouver amalgamates with the municipalities of Point Grey and South Vancouver.
- 1930 – Relief Camp Workers' Union organized
- 1934 – Malkin Bowl presents the first performance of the Vancouver Symphony Orchestra.
- 1935
  - Battle of Ballantyne Pier
  - Alpen Club founded
- 1936 – The new Vancouver City Hall at 12th and Cambie is completed.
- 1937 – Non-Partisan Association established
- 1938
  - Bloody Sunday event
  - The Lions Gate Bridge opens.
- 1939 – The third Hotel Vancouver landmark is completed.
- 1942 – Vancouver Magic Circle formed
- 1948 – The first television broadcast is received from Seattle.
- 1953 – Vancouver's first TV station, CBUT, goes on the air.
- 1954
  - Empire Stadium is constructed for the British Empire Games.
  - British Empire and Commonwealth Games
- 1956 – Vancouver Aquarium opened
- 1958 – Vancouver Opera founded
- 1959 – Oakridge Centre, Vancouver Maritime Museum, Queen Elizabeth Theatre and the Deas Island Tunnel officially open.
- 1960 – Ironworkers Memorial Second Narrows Crossing opened
- 1962 – Vancouver Playhouse Theatre Company founded
- 1963 – The Port of Vancouver ranks first among Canadian ports in tonnage.
- 1964 – The BC Lions football team win the Canadian Football League’s Grey Cup.
- 1967
  - Greater Vancouver Regional District established
  - Vancouver Magazine founded
  - The Georgia Straight founded
- 1970 – The Vancouver Canucks play their first game in the National Hockey League in the Pacific Coliseum.
- 1971
  - Gastown Riots
  - Vancouver School of Theology established
  - The 10-kilometre (6.2 mi) pedestrian seawall at Stanley Park officially opens. Gastown and Chinatown are designated as historic districts by the provincial government.
  - Vancouver Science Fiction Convention organized for the first time
- 1972 – Vancouver Marathon begins
- 1973 – Granville Square completed. The control tower of Vancouver Harbour Water Airport is located in top of it.
- 1974
  - The refurbished steam locomotive Royal Hudson has its inaugural run.
  - Disc sports debut in Vancouver on Kitsilano Beach with the Vancouver Open Frisbee Championships.
- 1976 – Habitat I, the first United Nations conference on urban sustainability, is held in various venues throughout Vancouver.
- 1978
  - Vancouver International Children's Festival debuts
  - The city celebrates the bicentennial of British explorer Captain James Cook's arrival in the region in 1778. Captain Cook had explored and mapped much of the region.
- 1979 – The Vancouver Whitecaps (NASL) win the North American Soccer League championship.
- 1981 – The Vancouver Men's Chorus debuts.
- 1982 – The Vancouver International Film Festival begins.
- 1983 – BC Place Stadium opens. The world's largest air-supported dome (60,000 seats) is the home of the BC Lions football team as well as trade shows, large gatherings, and major star concerts.
- 1984 – Vancouver International Jazz Festival established
- 1985 – The SkyTrain begins service, with much of its route being along that of the city's first public transit system, the 1891 interurban.
- 1986
  - The Alex Fraser Bridge opens.
  - Vancouver celebrates its centennial by hosting Expo 86 on the north shore of False Creek.
  - Vancouver Police Museum established
  - Vancouver Recital Society launched
  - King David School, Vancouver founded
  - Canada Place opens
- 1989
  - Vancouver hosts the World Police and Fire Games.
  - SkyBridge built
- 1990
  - Gay Games
  - Vancouver Learning Network debuts
- 1992 – Vancouver Aboriginal Child and Family Services Society incorporated
- 1993 – Vancouver Hospital and Health Sciences Centre formed
- 1994 – The Vancouver Canucks hockey team reach the Stanley Cup Final for the second time in twelve years, only to lose out to the New York Rangers; Fans riot in the streets of downtown Vancouver following the loss. The BC Lions football team win the Grey Cup.
- 1995
  - West Coast Express opens
  - A new Vancouver Public Library building is constructed in the shape of the Roman Colosseum
  - General Motors Place, a new hockey, basketball and entertainment complex opens.
  - The Vancouver Grizzlies basketball team play their inaugural season.
  - The Ford Center for the Performing Arts opens to the public.
- 1996 – The Vancouver International Airport expands its terminal and adds a third runway.
- 1997 – CIVT-TV goes on the air.
- 1998
  - Vancouver Downtown Historic Railway inaugurated
  - Vancouver International Dance Festival established
- 2000 – Vancouver Canadians founded

== 21st century ==
- 2001 – British Columbia TV realignment
- 2003
  - Vancouver is selected as the host city for 2010 Olympic Winter Games.
  - U-Pass implemented
- 2004 – Vancouver International Digital Festival debuts
- 2005 – The Vancouver International Film Centre is completed.
- 2006
  - World Urban Forum III
  - Vancouver International Burlesque Festival debuts
  - 2006 storms in Vancouver
- 2007 – Killing of Robert Dziekański
- 2009
  - Vancouver hosts the World Police and Fire Games.
  - The Canada Line opens, connecting downtown to YVR and Richmond.
- 2010
  - Vancouver hosts the Winter Olympics and Paralympics.
  - General Motors Place (now Rogers Arena) opens.
- 2011 – The Vancouver Canucks hockey team reach the Stanley Cup Final for the third time in 40 years, only to lose out to the Boston Bruins in seven games. Fans riot in the streets of downtown Vancouver following the loss.
- 2013 – First ever Vancouver International Busker Festival
- 2014 – Vancouver hosts TED.
- 2015 – Vancouver hosts matches of the 2015 FIFA Women's World Cup at BC Place.
- 2019 – Vancouver hosts the NHL (National Hockey League) draft.
- 2020 – COVID-19 pandemic in Vancouver

== See also ==
- List of years in Canada
- History of Vancouver
