= Vancouver Film Festival =

The Canadian city of Vancouver hosts three film festivals:

- Vancouver Asian Film Festival, founded in 1996 and held annually in November
- Vancouver International Film Festival, founded in 1982 and held annually September/October
- Vancouver Queer Film Festival, founded in 2004 and held annually in August

== See also ==
- List of festivals in Vancouver
- Vancouver Web Series Festival, founded in 2013 and held annually in March
