= Headwater (disambiguation) =

Headwater or headwaters are the sources of rivers.

It may also refer to:

- Headwater (band), a musical group
- Headwaters Tourism Association, a travel region of Ontario, Canada
- "Headwaters", a song by Andy Hawkins from Halo, 1994
