= Cherry Blossom Festival =

Cherry Blossom Festival may refer to:

- National Cherry Blossom Festival in Washington, DC
- The Vancouver Cherry Blossom Festival
- Subaru Cherry Blossom Festival of Greater Philadelphia, a spring celebration
- The annual Cherry Blossom Festival at Branch Brook Park in Newark, New Jersey
- The annual Cherry Blossom Festival in San Francisco, CA (Japantown)
- International Cherry Blossom Festival in Macon, GA
- Hanami, a traditional Japanese custom of celebrating the beauty of flowers, especially cherry blossoms
- An annual festival at the Brooklyn Botanic Garden in New York

== See also ==
- National Cherry Festival in Traverse City, Michigan
