= L'International des Feux =

Largest fireworks competition in the world

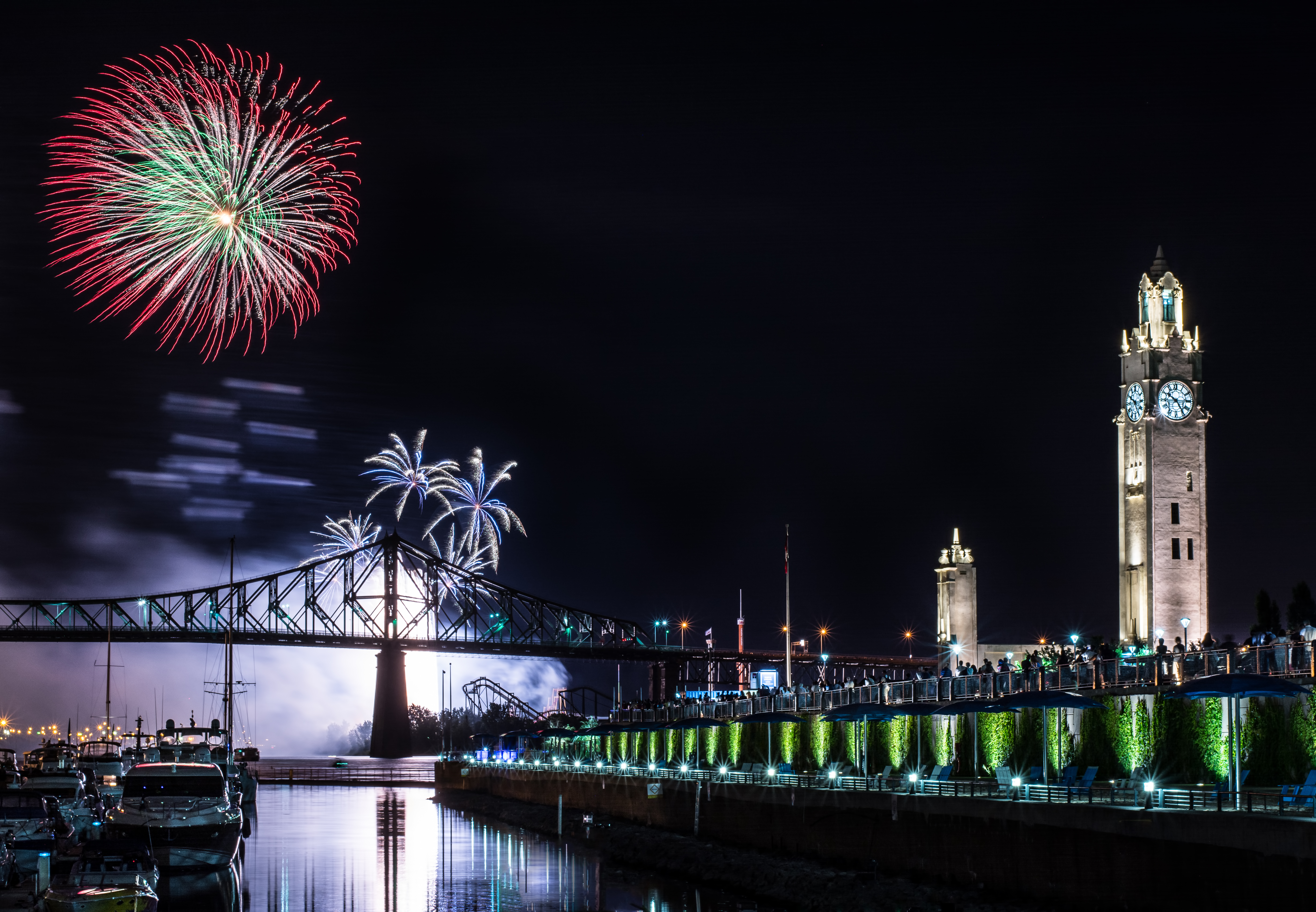
The Montreal Clock Tower during the Montreal Fireworks Festival.

The Montreal Fireworks Festival (French: L'International des Feux Loto-Québec) is the largest fireworks competition in the world. It has been held yearly in La Ronde over the Dolphin Lake since 1985 and is named after its main sponsor, Loto-Québec. It hosts an estimated 3 million spectators each year, with approximately 6,000 fireworks set off during each show. Each summer, eight or nine pyrotechnical companies from different countries present a 30-minute-long pyromusical show, competing for the Gold, Silver and Bronze Jupiters or trophies.

For the 20th anniversary in 2004, eight of the previous top competitors (all of whom had won the Gold Jupiter) were invited to compete for the Platinum Jupiter in June and July 2004, which was won by the German company WECO.

The competition takes the form of a series of biweekly fireworks shows usually beginning in late June and ending in late July. The fireworks are synchronized to music which is also broadcast over a provincial radio station (RockDétente in 2005, Rythme FM from 2006 onward). While spectators can buy tickets for seats, thousands of people watch the fireworks for free from nearby locations.

== Jupiter winners ==
Year	Gold Jupiter	Silver Jupiter	Bronze Jupiter
1985	France ** & Japan ***	Italy ** & United States ***	Spain
1986	Spain ** & China ***	France ** & United States ***	*
1987	United States	Germany	Spain
1988	Spain	Germany	United States
1989	Germany	United States	Spain & Canada
1990	France	Spain	Switzerland
1991	United States	Netherlands	Switzerland
1992	China	United States	Spain
1993	Spain	China	France
1994	United States	Australia	Japan
1995	Netherlands	France	Italy
1996	United States	Spain	Germany
1997	Italy	Germany	Austria
1998	United States	Italy	Spain
1999	United States	Canada	Spain
2000	Germany	Spain	Australia
2001	Spain	Australia	Chinese Taipei
2002	France	Portugal	Canada
2003	Canada	Australia	Hong Kong
2004	Germany	*	*
2005	Argentina	United States	Canada
2006	United States	France	Australia
2007	England	Germany	United States
2008	United States	Australia	China
2009	Canada	Hong Kong, China	United States
2010	Canada	Sweden	France
2011	Italy	France	Australia
2012	United States	Portugal	Italy
2013	Italy	Croatia	Spain
2014	Canada	Australia	France
2015	England	France	Hong Kong, China
2016	Spain	Sweden	Switzerland
2017	England	France	Portugal
2018	Philippines	Austria	United States
2019	Portugal	Australia	United States
2020	not held		
2021	not held		
2022	England	Hungary	Canada
2023	Finland	United States	Portugal
2024	France	Canada	Japan
2025	France	Switzerland	Italy
2026	Canada	Australia	China

* Not awarded.

** 1985 & 1986 Pyromusical Category Winners

*** 1985 & 1986 Traditional Category Winners

== Gold Jupiter winning teams ==
- 2024: France (Arteventia)
- 2023: Finland (Joho Pyro)
- 2022: England (Pyrotex Fireworx)
- 2021: The event did not take place due to the Covid-19 pandemic. However, throughout the summer of 2021, the event returned in a miniature, competition-free format where pop-up fireworks shows of five minutes in length took place at parks in different boroughs and suburbs of Montreal. The communities that hosted the mini fireworks shows were as follows:

Date	Borough/Community
July 24	Rivière-des-Prairies–Pointe-aux-Trembles
July 31	Mercier–Hochelaga-Maisonneuve
August 7	Verdun (Île-des-Sœurs)
August 14	Ahuntsic-Cartierville and Saint-Léonard
August 21	Dollard-des-Ormeaux and Pointe-Claire
August 28	Lachine

- 2020: Did not take place due to Covid-19 pandemic
- 2019: Portugal ( Groupo Luso Pirotecnica.)
- 2018: Philippines (Dragon Fireworks Inc.)
- 2017: England (Jubilee Fireworks Ltd.)
- 2016: Spain (Ricasa)
- 2015: England (Jubilee Fireworks Ltd.)
- 2014: Canada (Fireworks Spectaculars and Royal Pyrotechnie Colab )
- 2013: Italy (PyroEmotions & PyrodigiT Team)
- 2012: United States (Atlas Pyrovision Productions)
- 2011: Italy (Pirotecnica Morsani SRL)
- 2010: Canada (Fireworks Spectaculars)
- 2009: Canada (Royal Pyrotechnie)
- 2008: United States (Pyrotecnico)
- 2007: England (Pains Fireworks)
- 2006: United States (Melrose Pyrotechnics)
- 2005: Argentina (Fuegos Artificiales Júpiter)
- 2004: Germany - Platinum Jupiter (WECO)
- 2003: Canada (Royal Pyrotechnie)
- 2002: France (Société Lacroix-Ruggieri)
- 2001: Spain (Pirotècnia Igual)
- 2000: Germany (Weco Pyrotechnische Fabrik)
- 1999: United States (Performance Pyrotechnic Associates)
- 1998: United States (Performance Pyrotechnic Associates)
- 1997: Italy (Ipon s.r.l.)
- 1996: United States (Performance Pyrotechnic Associates)
- 1995: Netherlands (JNS Pyrotechniek)
- 1994: United States (Performance Pyrotechnic Associates)
- 1993: Spain (Pirotecnia Caballer)
- 1992: China (Sunny International)
- 1991: United States (Pyrotechnology Inc.)
- 1990: France (Société Étienne Lacroix)
- 1989: Germany (Lünig Feuerwerk Stuttgart)
- 1988: Spain (Pirotècnia Igual)
- 1987: United States (Austin Fireworks, Inc.)
- 1986: Spain (Pirotecnia Caballer)** & China (Dongguan Fireworks)***
- 1985: France (Société Étienne Lacroix)** & Japan (Marutamaya Ogatsu)***

** Winners of the 1985 & 1986 Pyromusical Category

*** Winners of the 1985 & 1986 Traditional Category

== Viewing locations ==
Although the fireworks are fired from La Ronde on Saint Helen's Island, they can easily be seen from many points in the Montreal area: elsewhere on Saint Helen's Island; in Longueuil; on the Jacques Cartier Bridge, which is closed to traffic from around 8 p.m. until the end of the show; the Old Port of Montreal; or locations along the shore or on a boat on the Saint Lawrence River.

== See also ==
- Fireworks competitions
