= Containerart =

Public art event

ContainerArt was a travelling public art event and exhibition project, which used shipping containers to display works of contemporary art from 2005-2012. The containers displayed different works of art in each location and at each event. As a form of installation and place-based art, ContainerArt was part of an emerging practice of re-purposing shipping containers in urban environments and shipping container art.

ContainerArt began in Italy and was produced by the Associazione Culturale ContainerArt.

ContainerArt NYC 2006 in co-production with DiVA fair

The Associazione Culturale ContainerArt was an Italian non-profit association headed by Ronald Lewis Facchinetti. Facchinetti's curatorial philosophy was described in his book "Beauty Inside", and was primarily concerned with helping the viewer achieve the "aesthetic experience" while isolated inside a container and in front of the work of art. Later, ContainerArt also operated as an international franchise with partners in various countries, including Brazil, China, Canada and Israel. The international partners developed and curated their local shipping container art exhibits with support from ContainerArt, but with independent themes and goals. Events in both Sao Paulo and New York City focused on video art installations inside the containers.

ContainerArt events usually lasted for 10 days during which the container was open to the public. Containers were placed in streets and public parks. Maps were distributed so that visitors could explore neighbourhoods and places through art. ContainerArt also placed "bStrogs" or street blogs outside the open containers. Computers connected to the internet were sometimes used to comment on the work. ContainerArt also made use of Bluetooth technologies to communicate information on the works and events to the phones of passers-by.

== Exhibitions ==
Italy
Year	City	Containers	Theme	Partner(s)
2005	Bergamo	21		
2005	Varese	21		
2007	Genoa	24		
2007	Rome	14		
2008	Milan	6		
2008	Turin	2		
2008	Casale Monferrato	4		
2008	Genova	23	"Ecosystems"	the Kaohsiung Museum of Fine Arts
2008	Milan, Tirana, Turin, Venice	13	"Beauty Inside Will Save the World"	

International franchise partner exhibits
Year	City	Containers	Theme	Partners
2006	New York City	8	Video art	DiVA Video Art fair
2007	Jerusalem	3		
2008	São Paulo	12	Video art	Lucas Bambozzi and Cao Guimarães
2009	Vancouver	15	Repurposed materials	Pacific National Exhibition
2011	Edmonton			Capital Ex Fair
2011	Vancouver	15		Pacific National Exhibition
2012	Vancouver			Pacific National Exhibition

== Selection process ==
ContainerArt projects not curated by content partners were directly chosen by Ronald Lewis Facchinetti in association with local co-curators or franchisees. Any artist could apply by sending a project and filling out an application available on the ContainerArt website.

Artists could exhibit free of charge. Artists whose project was approved were assigned a container in which to exhibit their work. The event allowed them to display their project in an unusual context with wide access to the general population of a city.
