= Merritt Mountain Music Festival =

Merritt Mountain Music Festival was an outdoor music festival in Merritt, British Columbia, Canada. In 2005, the festival hosted a record breaking attendance of approximately 148,000 people throughout the 6 day event.

In 2009, the festival ownership stated that they may not return in 2010 due to disappointing attendance, unless a financial partner could be found. The festival returned in 2011 with lower admission and camping prices in an effort to boost attendance, but the 2012 festival was cancelled due to low ticket sales.

== 2009 Main Stage Line-up ==
=== Thursday July 9 ===
- Paul Brandt

=== Friday July 10 ===
- The Steve Miller Band
- Emerson Drive
- Jo Dee Messina

=== Saturday July 11 ===
- Kenny Chesney
- Johnny Reid

=== Sunday July 12 ===
- George Canyon
- Pam Tillis

== 2008 Main Stage Line-up ==
- Jessie Farrell
- Pat Green
- Aaron Lines
- Sugarland
- Beverley Mahood
- Aaron Pritchett
- Dierks Bentley
- Hank Williams Jr.
- Kelly Brock
- Gord Bamford
- The Wilkinsons
- The Judds
- Rick Tippe
- George Fox
- Jo Hikk
- Sara Evans

== 2007 Main Stage Line-up ==
- Reba McEntire
- Tanya Tucker
- Carrie Underwood
- Gretchen Wilson
- Creedence Clearwater Revisited
- Emerson Drive
- The Road Hammers
- Mark Wills
- Johnny Reid
- Duane Steele
- Jimmy Murphy
- Minnie Murphy
- Kenny Hess
- Appaloosa
- Sibel Thrasher and the Gospel Infuzion
- Country Sisters
- The Molnars
- The Sapach Family Band
- Tracy Chamberlain
- Marion Weston
- Jessica Griffiths
- Headwater

== 2006 Main Stage Line-up ==
- Martina McBride
- Travis Tritt
- Big & Rich
- Randy Travis
- Carolyn Dawn Johnson
- The Road Hammers
- BlackHawk
- Little Texas
- Restless Heart
- Darryl Worley
- Aaron Pritchett
- Michelle Wright
- Rick Tippe
- Elmer Tippe
- Dr. Hook
- The Higgins

== 2005 Main Stage Line-up ==
- Tim McGraw
- Lonestar
- Chely Wright
- Lynne Taylor Donovan
- Mel Tillis
- Paul Brandt
- Neal McCoy
- Ian Tyson
- Nitty Gritty Dirt Band
- George Canyon
- Sugarland
- Brad Johner
- Doc Walker
- Sean Hogan
- Corb Lund Band

== 2004 Main Stage Line-up ==
- Brooks & Dunn
- Dwight Yoakam
- Anne Murray
- Brad Paisley
- Sara Evans
- The Mavericks
- Gary Allan
- The Wilkinsons
- Deric Ruttan
- Lisa Brokop
- Jason McCoy
- Adam Gregory
- Beverley Mahood
- Jamie Warren
- Steve Fox
- Duane Steele
- Kenny Hess
- Lonesome Road
- Jake Mathews

== 2003 Main Stage Line-up ==
- LeAnn Rimes
- Clint Black
- Loretta Lynn
- Jo Dee Messina
- Marty Stuart
- Terri Clark
- John Berry
- David Lee Murphy
- Lee Roy Parnell
- Adam Gregory
- Dr. Hook
- The Good Brothers
- Rick Tippe
- Patricia Conroy
- Brad Johner
- Aaron Pritchett
- Sean Hogan
- Kenny Hess
- J. R. Vautour

== 2002 Main Stage Line-up ==
- Alan Jackson
- Martina McBride
- Trisha Yearwood
- Keith Urban
- Carolyn Dawn Johnson
- Daryle Singletary
- Rhett Akins
- Wade Hayes
- Lisa Brokop
- Julian Austin
- Chris Cummings
- Steve Fox
- Abba Mania
- Doc Walker
- John Landry
- Gil Grand

== See also ==
- List of country music festivals
- Music in Canada
