= Hataw Pinoy Philippine Summer Festival =

Hataw Pinoy is the first Philippine summer festival in British Columbia, Canada. Planned as an annual event by the Filipino Canadian Cultural Heritage (FCCH) Society of British Columbia, in cooperation with the Reyfort Media Group, this event, held at the Richmond Olympic Oval grounds on August 28 & 29, 2010, attracted approximately 15,000 guests over the two days of festivities. Filipinos travelled from as far away as Prince Rupert and Seattle to this event which showcased various cultural presentations from their native country.
