= Headwater (band) =

Canadian band

- Origin: Vancouver, British Columbia, Canada
- Genres: Folk rock
- Years active: 2001–2015
- Members: Jonas Shandel; Noah Walker; Michael Rush; "Dizzy" Daniel Moorehead
- Past members: Matt Bryant: Tim Tweedale; Patrick Metzgar

Headwater is a band from Vancouver, British Columbia, Canada.

== History ==
Headwater was formed in 2001 by guitarist and percussionist Jonas Shandel and mandolinist/guitarist Matt Bryant, who had played together in a punk band in high school. The duo began performing in the Vancouver area, including on ferries, and developed into a band with four regular members and one of several drummers.

Their debut studio album in 2006, My Old Friend, sold four thousand copies in British Columbia in its first sixteen months. Their follow-up album, Lay You Down, was released in 2008 on their own label, Nowhere Town Records. They played as featured acts in festivals such as the 2008 TD Canada Trust Vancouver International Jazz Festival and the 2007 Merritt Mountain Music Festival. Songs from both albums were in regular rotation nationally on CBC Radio.

Headwater was invited to showcase at the 2008 Western Canadian Music Awards with label mates and tour collaborator Damanta. The band also performed at the 2008 Under the Volcano Festival in Vancouver.

By 2012, the band members were Shandel, Bryant, pedal steel player Tim Tweedle, and Pat Metzgar on upright bass. In April of that year, Headwater released a new single, "Your Love" from their third studio record, Push. A limited run of hand numbered vinyl was sold to promote the new EP, which was recorded by Marc L'Esperance and Bill Buckingham in Vancouver, British Columbia. The single was made available for free download, and Bryant wrote an article in the Georgia Straight on the subject of crowdfunding.

Headwater was one of the finalist bands in the 2012 Peak Performance Project.

The band became inactive in 2015.

== Members ==
=== Current ===
- Jonas Shandel: vocals, guitar
- Noah Walker: Guitars
- Michael Rush: Bass
- "Dizzy" Daniel Moorehead: Saxophone

=== Former ===
- Matt Bryant - guitar
- Tim Tweedale - pedal steel
- Patrick Metzgar - bass
