= Celebration of Light =

Annual musical fireworks competition

- Status: Suspended indefinitely
- Frequency: Annually
- Locations: Vancouver, British Columbia
- Inaugurated: 1990
- Organiser: Vancouver Fireworks Festival Society
- Sponsor: Honda
- Website: Official website

The Celebration of Light (branded as the Honda Celebration of Light for sponsorship reasons) was an annual musical fireworks competition in Vancouver, British Columbia, Canada. Originally named the Symphony of Fire under previous sponsorship, the first competition under the current name was held from July 25 to August 5, 1990. The celebration was one of Vancouver's largest and most well-known festivals, and was recognized as the longest-running offshore fireworks competition in the world. The multi-day event had an estimated annual attendance of 1.4 million people.

On November 25, 2025, it was announced that the event had been suspended indefinitely due to funding issues, including increased production costs and a loss of support from governments and sponsors. People around Vancouver expressed their sadness in a public outcry, and the Vancouver Fireworks Festival Society expressed their wish for the event to return with new sponsors, but shared in a statement that this was unlikely.

== 2025 program ==
The 2025 competition took place on July 19, 23, and 26. For the first time, the event included an all-Canadian lineup, featuring teams from Yukon, Quebec, and Nova Scotia. The winner of the competition was Team Nova Scotia.

Saturday, July 19
Province:	Yukon
Team:	Midnight Sun Fireworks
Theme:	20,000 Leagues Under English Bay
Wednesday, July 23
Province:	Quebec
Team:	Royal Pyrotechnie
Theme:	Champions
Saturday, July 26
Province:	Nova Scotia
Team:	Fireworks FX
Theme:	Voices of Fire

== 2024 program ==
The 2024 competition took place on July 20, 24, and 27. The participating countries were Portugal, Malaysia, and the United Kingdom. The winner of the 2024 competition was United Kingdom.

Saturday, July 20
Country:	Portugal
Team:	Macedos Pirotecnia
Theme:	Tune In
Wednesday, July 24
Country:	Malaysia
Team:	Pyro Tact
Theme:	Majestik in the Dark
Saturday, July 27
Country:	United Kingdom
Team:	Pyrotex Fireworx
Theme:	Lights, Camera, Action - Saturday Night at the Movies

== 2023 program ==
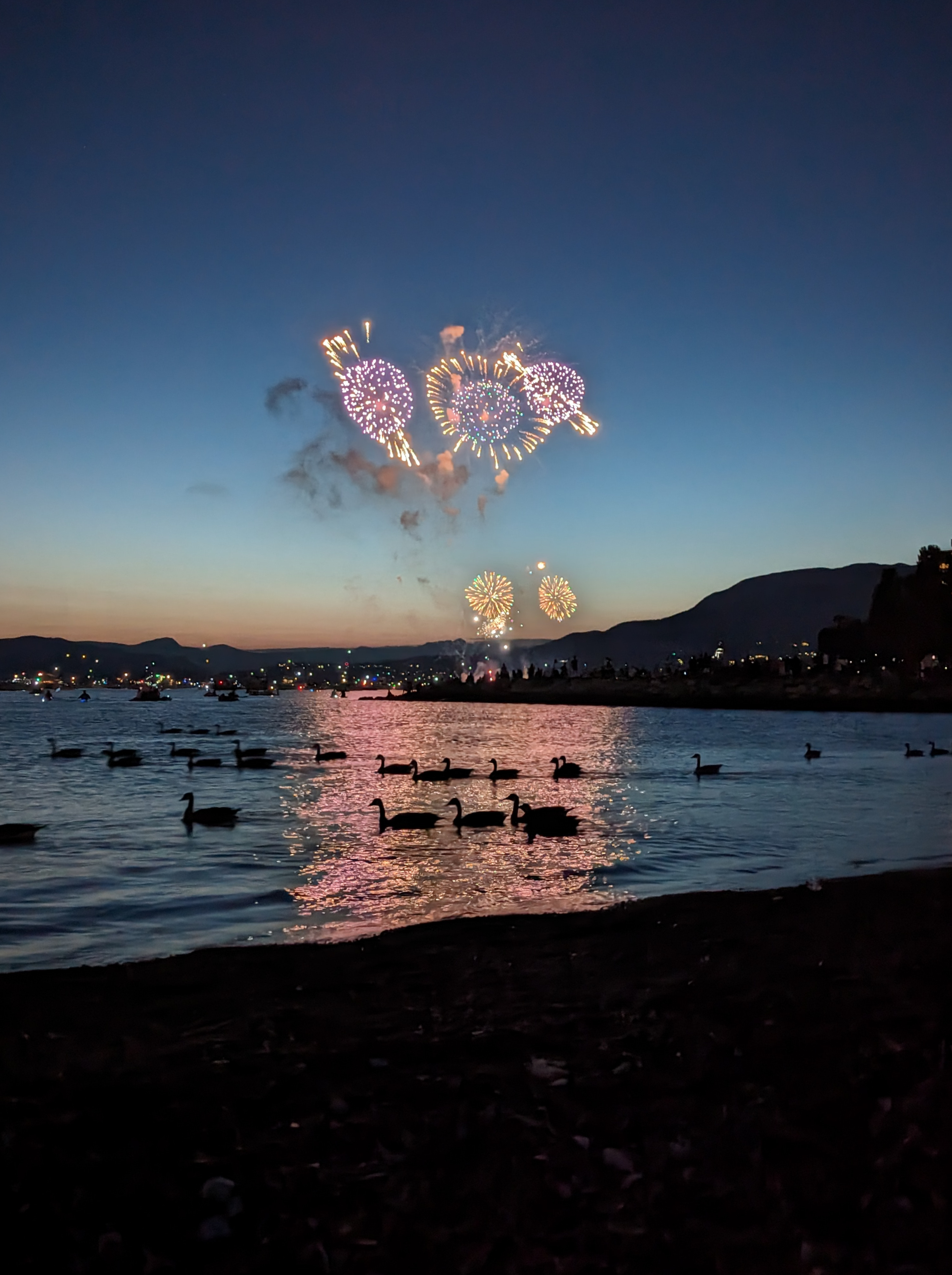
View from Sunset Beach Park in 2023

The 2023 competition took place on July 22, 26, and 29. The participating countries were Australia, Mexico, and the Philippines. The winner of the 2023 competition was Philippines.

Saturday, July 22
Country:	Australia
Team:	Howard & Sons Pyrotechnics
Theme:	Good Night Out
Wednesday, July 26
Country:	Mexico
Team:	Grupo AVACON
Theme:	The Time Machine
Saturday, July 29
Country:	Philippines
Team:	Blue Peacock Fireworks
Theme:	Independence Day (Liberation)

== 2022 program ==
The 2022 competition took place on July 23, 27, and 30. The participating countries are Japan, Canada, and Spain. The winner of the 2022 competition was Canada.

Saturday, July 23
Country:	Japan
Team:	Akariya Fireworks
Theme:	None
Wednesday, July 27
Country:	Canada
Team:	Midnight Sun Fireworks
Theme:	Pirates of the Caribbean
Saturday, July 30
Country:	Spain
Team:	Pirotecnia Zaragozana
Theme:	Heroes

== 2021 program (cancelled) ==
The event was postponed until July 23, 27, and 30 in 2022 due to the ongoing COVID-19 pandemic in British Columbia.

== 2020 program (cancelled) ==
In 2020, the competition was cancelled due to the COVID-19 pandemic in British Columbia.

== 2019 program ==
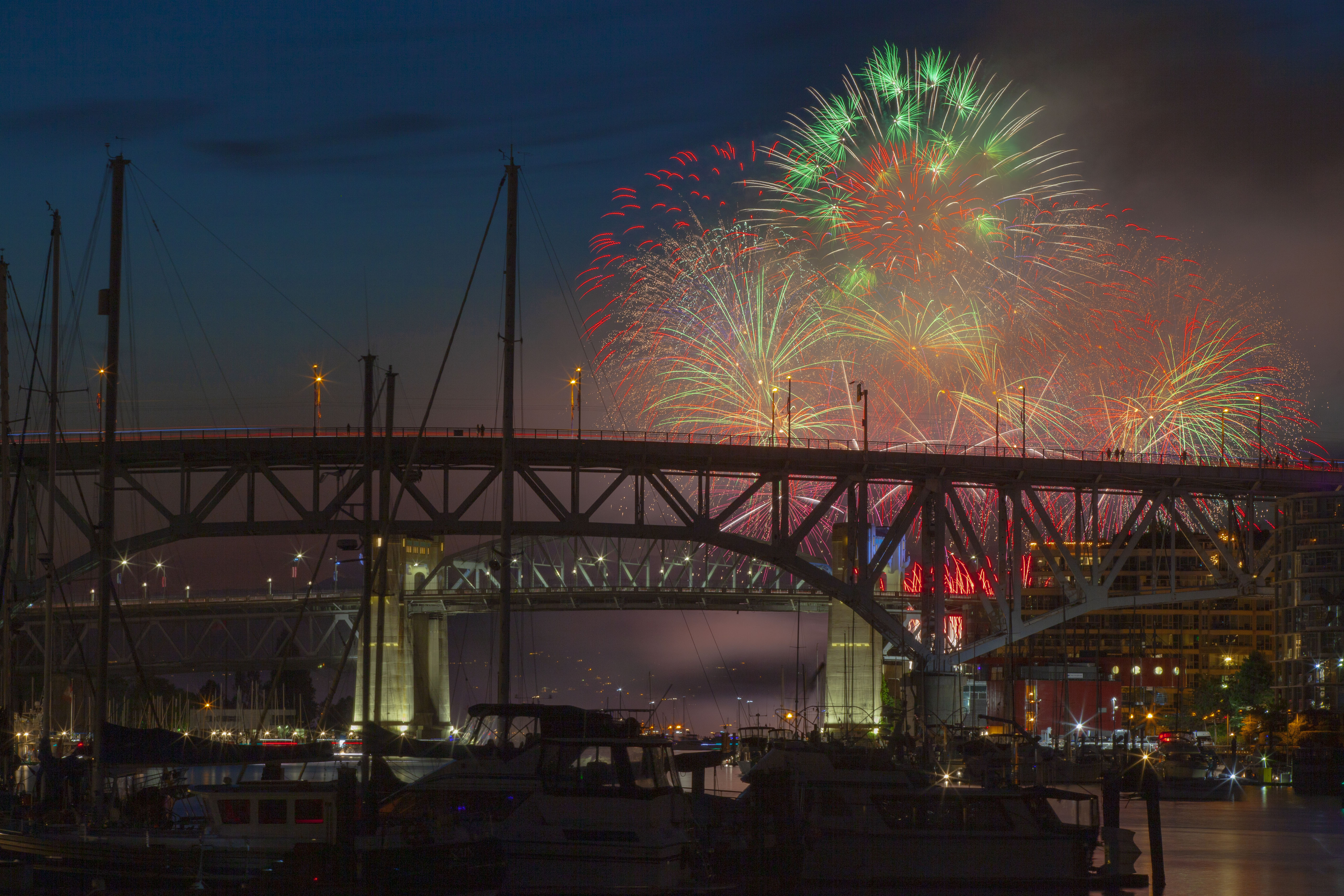
Celebration Of Light by Team India

The 2019 Honda Celebration of Light took place on July 27, July 31, and August 3, 2019. The participating countries were India, Canada, and Croatia. It was the first year where India and Croatia have participated in the competition. The winner of the 2019 competition was Canada.

Saturday, July 27
Country:	India
Team:	Amir Morani Fireworks
Theme:	Love
Website:	Amir Morani Fireworks
Wednesday, July 31
Country:	Canada
Team:	Firemaster Productions Inc.
Theme:	"Feel Good Hits of the Summer"
Website:	Firemaster Productions
Saturday, August 3
Country:	Croatia
Team:	Mirnovec Fireworks
Theme:	"Journey Through Cinema"

== 2018 program ==
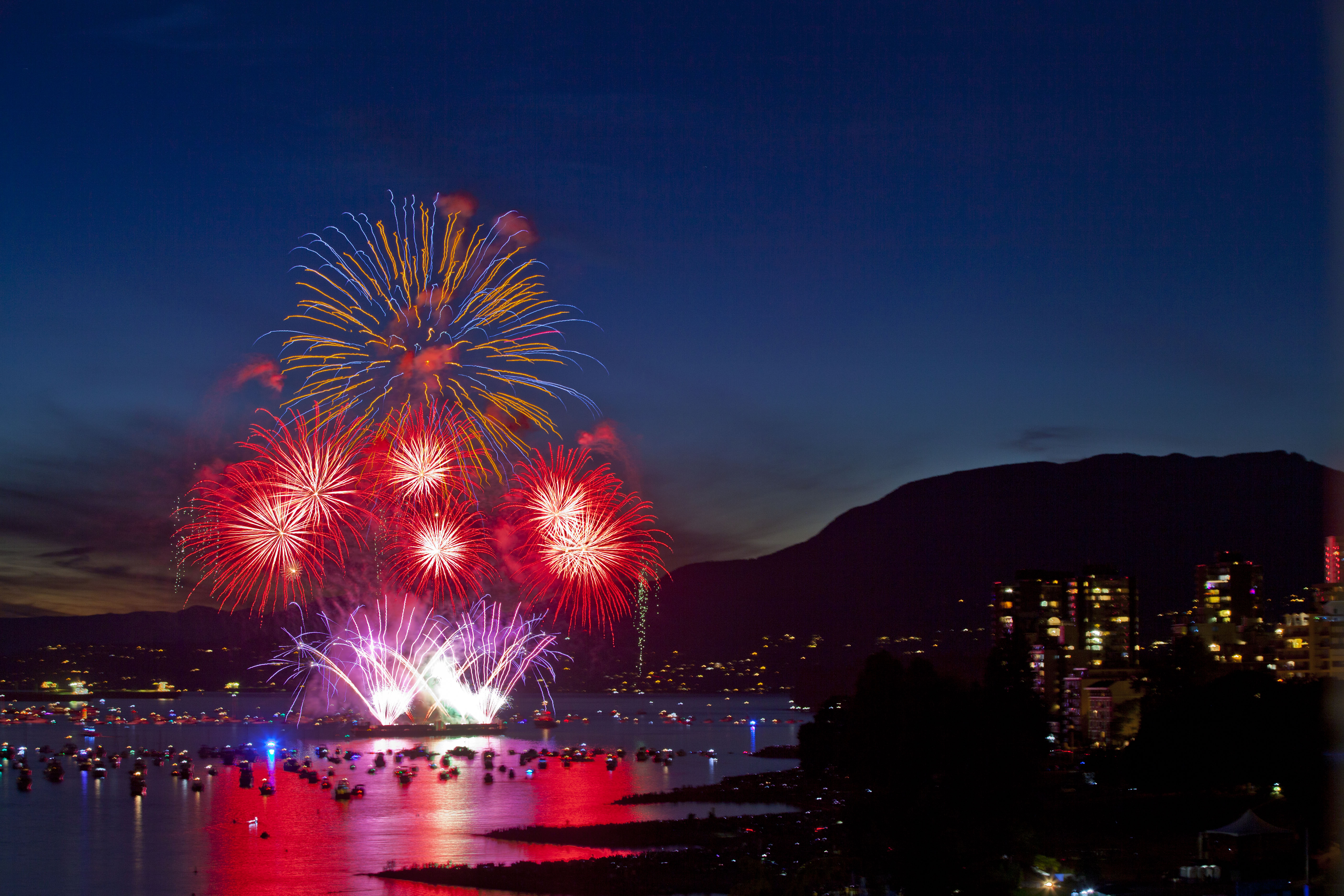
Celebration Of Light by Team South Korea

The 2018 Honda Celebration of Light took place on July 28, August 1, and August 4. The participating countries were South Africa, represented by Fireworks for Africa; Sweden, represented by Unique Pyrotechnic; and South Korea, by Daehan Fireworks Co. For the first time, all three competitors were required to incorporate the same theme into their fireworks display and musical accompaniment. The theme, which was voted by the public, was love. The winner was South Korea.

Saturday, July 28
Country:	South Africa
Team:	Fireworks for Africa
Website:	Fireworks for Africa
Wednesday, August 1
Country:	Sweden
Team:	Unique Pyrotechnic
Website:	Unique Pyrotechnic
Saturday, August 4
Country:	South Korea
Team:	Daehan Fireworks Co.

== 2017 program ==
The 2017 Honda Celebration of Light took place on July 29, August 2, and August 5, featuring competitors from Japan, the United Kingdom, and Canada. The competitor for Japan, Akariya, previously won the 2014 Honda Celebration of Light. Widely regarded as the premiere pyrotechnic company in the UK, the multi-award-winning Jubilee Fireworks Ltd became the holders of the first "Champions of Champions" title after winning both national competitions: The British Fireworks Championships and The British Musical Fireworks Championships. Royal Pyrotechnie, recognized as the most decorated fireworks firm in Canada, is the only group to win three Gold Jupiter awards during the annual L'International des Feux Loto-Québec competition.

To celebrate Canada's 150th anniversary, each of the competitors were required to include one iconic Canadian song into their display, extending the traditional length of the shows (25 minutes) for an additional 3 minutes (for a total of 28 minutes). The songs were voted by the public on Honda's Celebration of Light Facebook page; the three chosen were "Ahead by a Century" by The Tragically Hip, "Hallelujah" by Leonard Cohen, and "Summer of '69" by Bryan Adams. The winner of the competition was Japan.

Saturday, July 29
Country:	Japan
Team:	Akariya Fireworks
Theme:	Land of the Rising Sun
Canada 150 song selection:	"Hallelujah" by Leonard Cohen
Wednesday, August 2
Country:	United Kingdom
Team:	Jubilee Fireworks
Theme:	Kiss The Sky
Canada 150 song selection:	"Ahead by a Century" by The Tragically Hip
Website:	Jubilee Fireworks
Saturday, August 5
Country:	Canada
Team:	Royal Pyrotechnie
Theme:	Legends of Fire
Canada 150 song selection:	"Summer of '69" by Bryan Adams
Website:	Royal Pyrotechnie

== 2016 program ==
The 2016 Honda Celebration of Light took place on July 23, July 27, and July 30. The event featured the Netherlands, Australia, and the United States in competition. Notably, 2016 was the first time that the Netherlands has competed in the event. The Walt Disney Company, the world's largest consumer of fireworks, was the competitor for the United States, while Australia was represented by Howard & Sons, whose displays have included the opening and closing ceremonies for 2000 Summer Olympics in Sydney and opening and closing ceremonies for the 2010 Commonwealth Games in Delhi and 2006 Commonwealth Games in Melbourne. Team USA won the competition. Vancouver Police had to shut down English Bay Beach for the Team USA show, due to capacity concerns.

Saturday, July 23
Country:	Netherlands
Team:	Royal Fireworks
Theme:	Journey in Time
Website:	Royal Fireworks
Wednesday, July 27
Country:	Australia
Team:	Howard & Sons Pyrotechnics
Theme:	Live and Loud
Website:	Howard & Sons Pyrotechnics
Saturday, July 30
Country:	United States
Team:	Walt Disney Company
Theme:	Disney Music Extravaganza
Website:	Walt Disney Company

== 2015 program ==
The 2015 Honda Celebration of Light was scheduled for July 25, July 29, and August 1. For the 25th anniversary of the event, three returning competitors from China, Brazil, and Canada participated. The 2015 competition winner was Canada.

Saturday, July 25
Country:	China
Company:	Jiangxi Province Lidu Fireworks Corporation Ltd.
Team:	Team Lidu
Website:	www.lidufireworks.com
Wednesday, July 29
Country:	Brazil
Team:	Group Vision Show
Saturday, August 1
Country:	Canada
Team:	Archangel Fireworks
Website:	www.archangelfireworks.com

== 2014 program ==
The 2014 Honda Celebration of Light was scheduled for July 26, July 30, and August 2, featuring performances by the United States, France, and Japan respectively. The competitors were newcomers to Vancouver, though their respective countries have previously participated before. The 2014 competition winner was Japan.

Saturday, July 26
Country:	United States
Team:	Pyrotecnico
Website:	www.pyrotecnico.com
Wednesday, July 30
Country:	France
Team:	F.C. Pyro
Saturday, August 2
Country:	Japan
Team:	Akariya Fireworks
Theme:	"The Art of Survival"

== 2013 program ==
The 2013 Honda Celebration of Light was scheduled for July 27, July 31, and August 3, with performances by the United Kingdom, Canada, and Thailand respectively. 2013 was the first year that Thailand participated in the event as part of the organizers' ongoing efforts to introduce a new nation to the program each year. The 2013 competition winner was Canada.

Saturday, July 27
Country:	United Kingdom
Team:	Pyro 2000
Theme:	"Licence to Thrill" (James Bond)
Website:	www.pyro2000.co.uk
Wednesday, July 31
Country:	Canada
Team:	Calgary-Based Fireworks Spectaculars
Theme:	"A Wonderful World/Into a Raging River"
Website:	www.fireworksspectaculars.com
Saturday, August 3
Country:	Thailand
Team:	Thailand Fireworks
Theme:	Classical Thai music
Website:	thailandfirework.net

== 2012 program ==
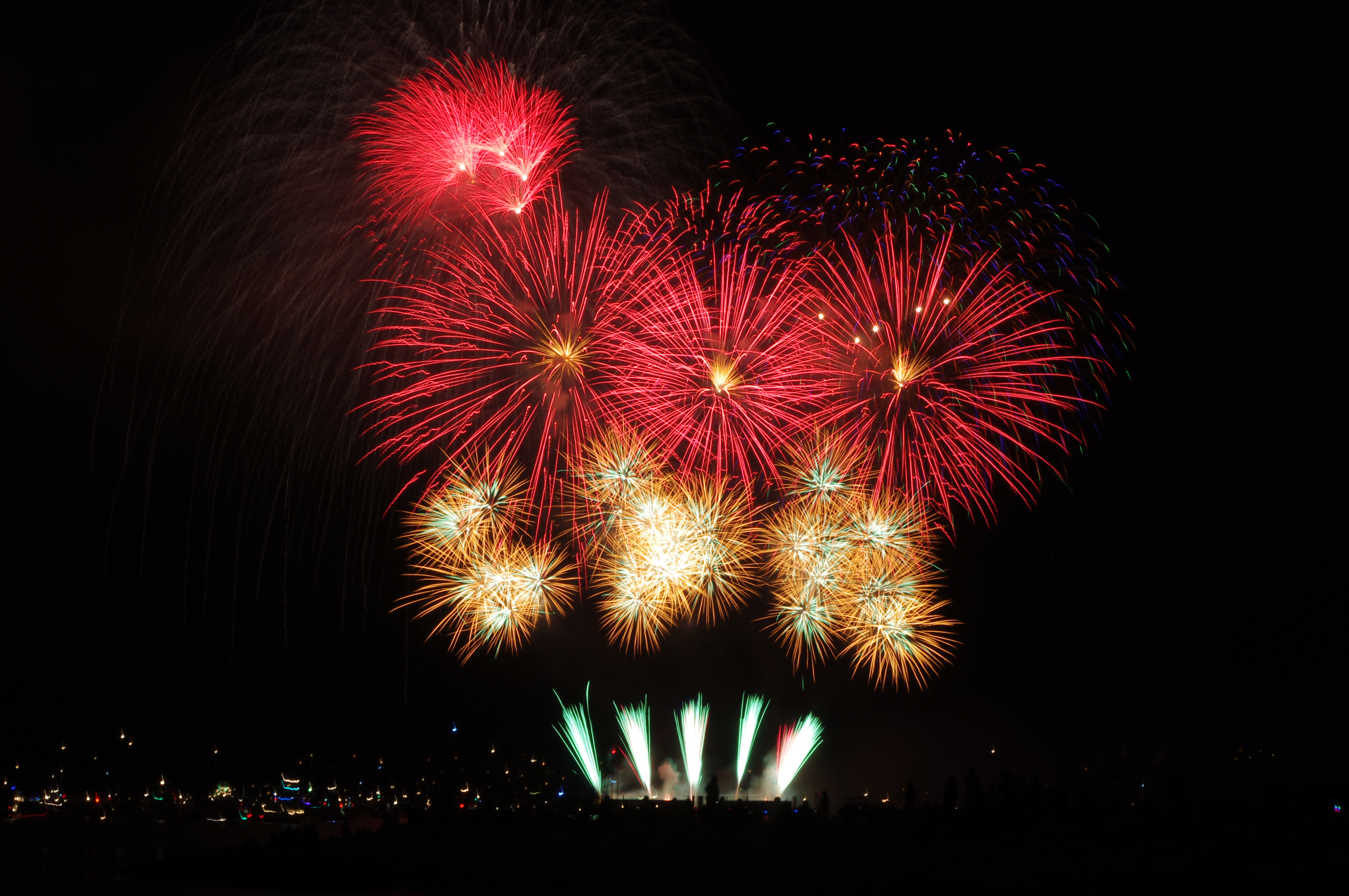
The 2012 Brazil show

The 2012 Honda Celebration of Light saw teams from Vietnam and Brazil as newcomers, while the Italian team of Pirotecnica Soldi was more established. Canada did not participate for the first time in six years as producers of the event had been looking for new countries to compete from each continent for the next three years. The 2012 competition winner was Italy.

Saturday, July 28
Country:	Vietnam
Team:	Team Danang Fireworks
Wednesday, August 1
Country:	Brazil
Team:	Group Vision Show
Saturday, August 4
Country:	Italy
Team:	Pirotecnica Soldi
Website:	www.pirotecnicasoldi.it

== 2011 program ==
The 2011 HSBC Celebration of Light presented a "Battle of Champions" by featuring three previous competition winners: China (represented by 2009 winner Red Eagle Industrial and Trade Co. Ltd), Spain (represented by 2010 winner Pirotecnia Igual), and Canada (represented by 2007 and 2008 winner Archangel Fireworks Inc). The winner for the 2011 competition was China.

Saturday, July 30
Country:	China
Team:	Red Eagle Manufacturing Industrial and Trade Co. Ltd
Theme:	China Storm
Wednesday, August 3
Country:	Spain
Team:	Pirotecnia Igual
Theme:	Odyssey
Website:	www.pirotecniaigual.com
Saturday, August 6
Country:	Canada
Team:	Archangel Fireworks
Theme:	Then and Now
Website:	www.archangelfireworks.com

== 2010 program ==
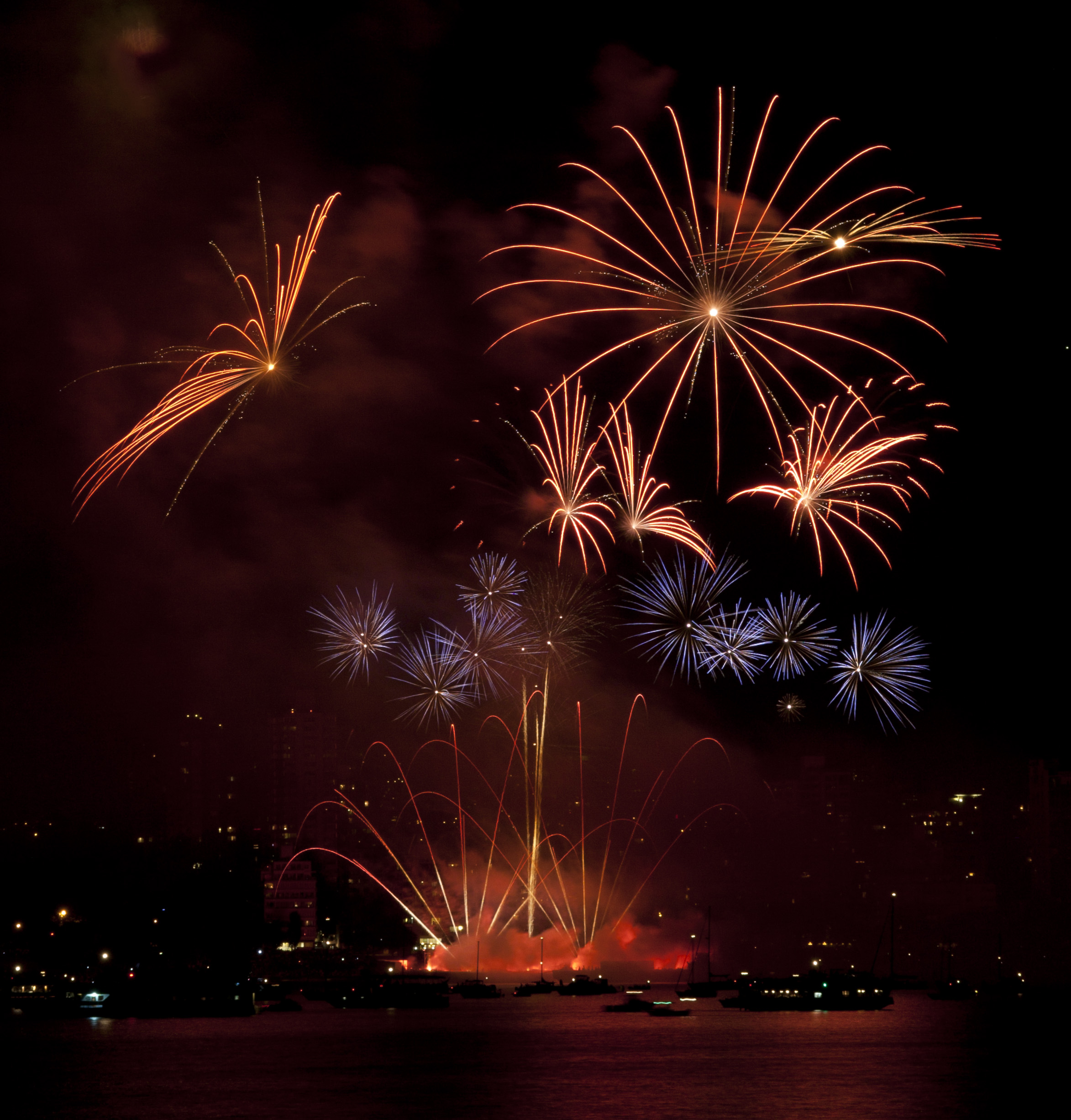
Fireworks by China on July 31, 2010.

The 2010 HSBC Celebration of Light winner was Spain (Pirotecnia Igual).

Wednesday, July 21
Country:	United States
Company:	Rozzi Inc.
Theme:	In the Mood
Saturday, July 24
Country:	Spain
Team:	Pirotecnia Igual
Theme:	Heaven and Hell
Website:	www.pirotecniaigual.com
Wednesday, July 28
Country:	Mexico
Team:	Lux Pirotecnia
Theme:	Journey
Website:	www.luxpirotecnia.com
Saturday, July 31
Country:	Canada, China
Team:	Groupe Fiatlux-Ampleman
Theme:	Tribute to China/The Butterfly Lovers

== 2009 program ==
The 2009 HSBC Celebration of Light winner was China (Red Eagle Industrial and Trade Co. Ltd.).

Wednesday, July 22
Country:	Canada
Company:	Archangel Fireworks Inc.
Theme:	No Place Like Home
Website:	www.archangelfireworks.com
Saturday, July 25
Country:	South Africa
Team:	Fireworks for Africa
Theme:	Tapestry of Colour
Wednesday, July 29
Country:	United Kingdom
Team:	PYRO2000
Theme:	Parasols Over the Pacific
Saturday, August 1
Country:	China
Team:	Red Eagle Industrial and Trade Co. Ltd.
Theme:	Through the Looking Glass

== 2008 program ==
The 2008 HSBC Celebration of Light winner was Canada, making back-to-back wins for Archangel Fireworks Inc.

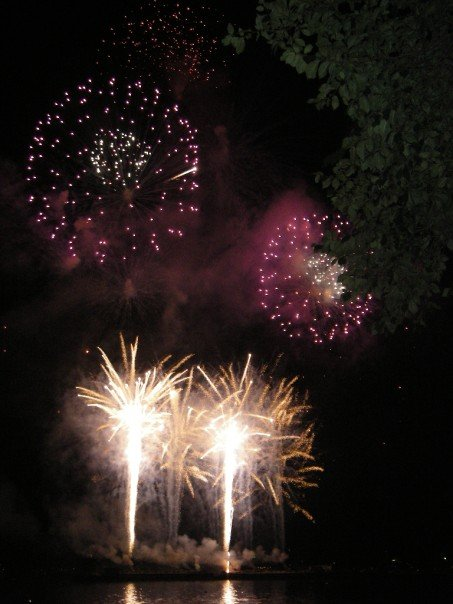
Fireworks from China's 2008 show, from Kitsilano Beach

Wednesday, July 23
Country:	Canada
Company:	Archangel Fireworks Inc.
Theme:	Attack
Designer:	Kelly Guille & Sean Procter
Website:	www.archangelfireworks.com
Saturday, July 26
Country:	United States
Company:	Western Enterprises, Incorporated
Theme:	Love Will Change the World
Designer:	Gary P. Caimano
Website:	www.fireworksbywestern.com
Wednesday, July 30
Country:	China
Company:	Pyromagic Productions Ltd.
Theme:	Power of the Dream
Designer:	Wilson Mao
Website:	www.pyromagic.com.hk
Saturday, August 2
Grand Finale

== 2007 program ==
The 2007 HSBC Celebration of Light winner was Canada.

Wednesday, July 25
Country:	Spain
Company:	Ricardo Caballer Pirotechnica
Theme:	Fireworks and the 7th Earth
Designer:	Ricardo Caballer Cardo
Website:	www.ricardocaballer.com
Saturday, July 28
Country:	Canada
Company:	Archangel Fireworks Inc.
Theme:	Take Five to Jive
Designer:	Kelly Guille and Sean Procter
Website:	www.archangelfireworks.com
Wednesday, August 1
Country:	China
Company:	Jiangxi Province Lidu Fireworks Corporation Ltd.
Theme:	The Time Machine
Designer:	Xu Delong
Website:	www.lidufireworks.com
Saturday, August 4
Celebration Finale
Designer:	Yves Relave

== 2006 program ==
The 2006 winner was Mexico, who joined the competition for the first time.

Wednesday, July 26
Country:
Italy
Company:
A.P.E. di Parente Romualdo
Theme:
Magia Di Fuochi
Designer:
Michele Parente
Website:
www.parenteape.it
The Italian team's presentation is a peculiar and charming pyrotechnic show with wide variety of effects ranging from the sky to the water, dancing volcanoes, golden rain and a fantastic closure. Attendance was estimated at 400,000.

Saturday, July 29
Country:
China

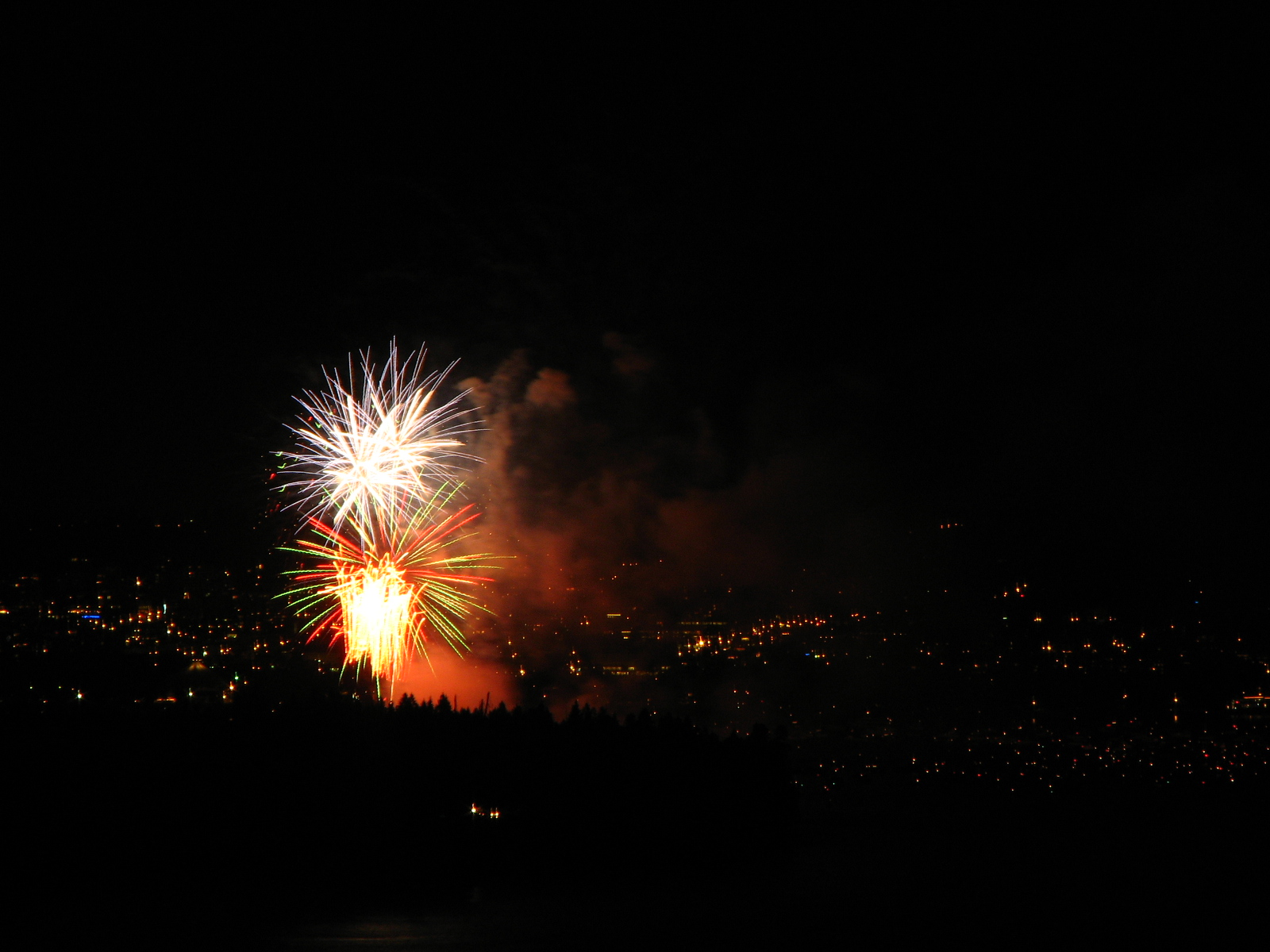
A portion of China's 2006 Show

Company:
Jiangxi Province Lidu Fireworks Corporation Ltd.
Theme:
Yellow River Odyssey
Designer:
Xu Delong
Website:
www.lidufireworks.com
The Chinese team's presentation features specific colours in each of the five sections: blue, silver and crackling, green, green falling leaves and gold. The music is performed by The Philharmonic Orchestra of China, accompanied by pianist Xiang-Dong Kong.

Wednesday, August 2
Country:
Czech Republic
Company:
Flash Barrandov Special Effects Ltd.
Theme:
Rhapsody in Blue
Designer:
Jaroslav Štolba
Website:
www.flash-sfx.cz
The Czech Republic show is an evening full of jazz music in four sections: Classical jazz, Conspiracy jazz, Latin jazz and Traditional jazz.

Saturday, August 5
Country:
Mexico
Company:
Lux Pirotecnia, S.A. de C.V.
Theme:
Siente México: Feel Mexico
Designer:
Jorge M. Márquez
Website:
www.luxpirotecnia.com
Past and future values come together in a program full of joy. A musical score that includes pre-Hispanic sounds, music in the history of carnival celebrations, traditional sounds mixed with innovative rhythms, and some of the best Mexican known values, friendship and fraternity are present in this show with the purpose to make you feel a little part of Mexico.

Celebration Finale
Designer:
Jaroslav Štolba
The Celebration Finale is specially designed to pay tribute to the HSBC Celebration of Light competition. The 6-minute Celebration Finale did not include components from participating countries.

== Previous years ==
Because of the change in sponsor, records are difficult to find before the year 2001.

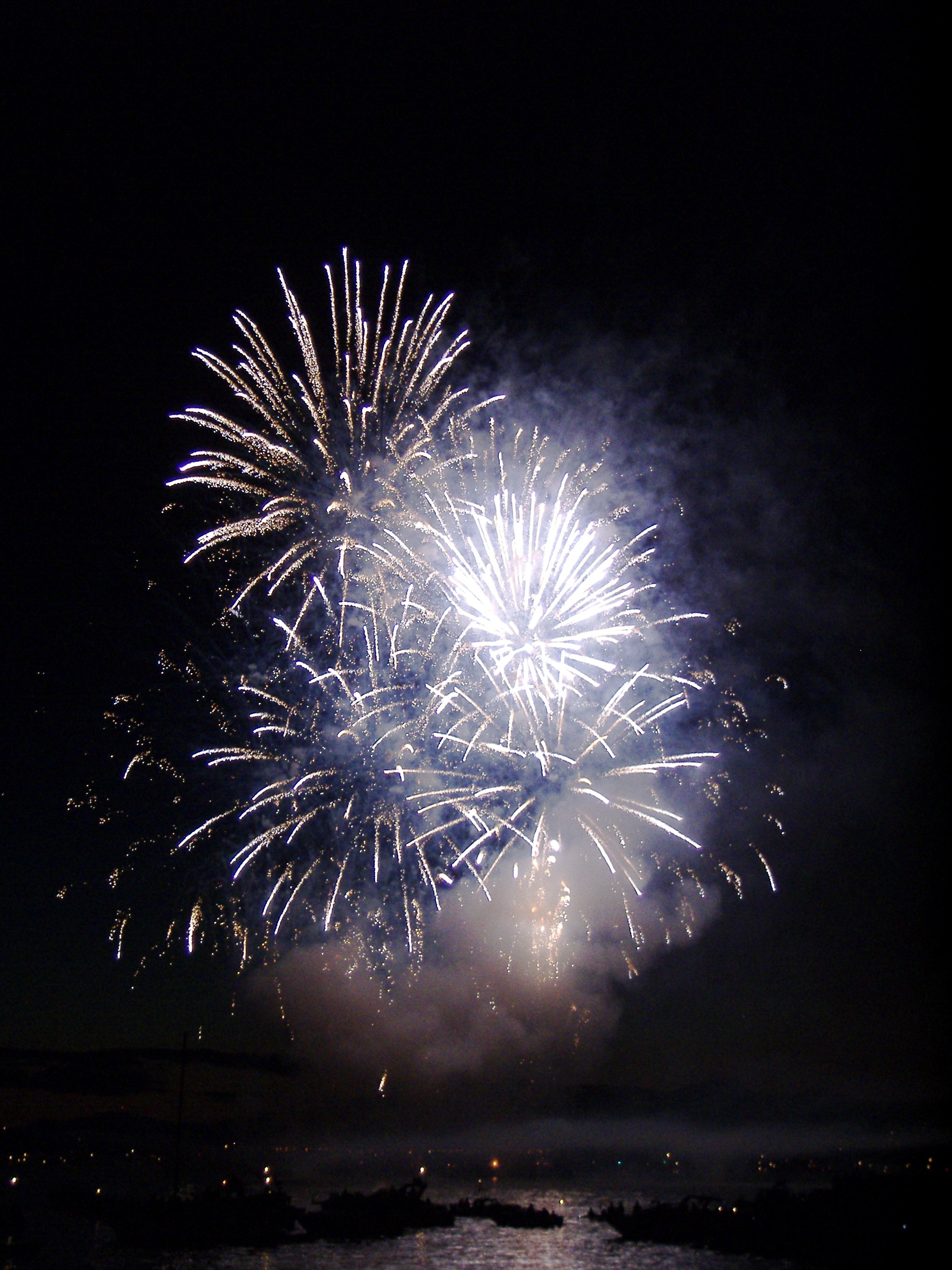
Fireworks display by Italy in 2006

=== 2006 ===
Winner: Mexico
Company:	Lux Pirotecnia, S.A. de C.V.
Show Theme:	Siente México: Feel Mexico
China
Company:	Jiangxi Province Lidu Fireworks Corporation Ltd.
Show Theme:	Yellow River Odyssey
Italy
Company:	A.P.E. di Parente Romualdo
Show Theme:	Magia Di Fuochi
Czech Republic
Company:	Flash Barrandov Special Effects Ltd.
Show Theme:	Rhapsody in Blue

=== 2005 ===
Winner: Sweden
Company:	Unique Pyrotechnic AB
Show Theme:	Kisses of fire
Canada
Company:	Concept Fiatlux Inc.
Show Theme:	Jazz in the sky
China
Company:	Beijing ZhongFa A.F. Consulting Co. Ltd.
Show Theme:	Voix de feu, feu de voix

=== 2004 ===
Winner: Sweden
Company:	Fyrverkeri Expertena AB
Show Theme:	Aurora Borealis over Canada
China
Company:	Beijing ZhongFa A.F. Consulting Co. Ltd.
Show Theme:	On ne dort pas ce soir
Spain
Company:	Vicente Caballer e Hijos S.L.
Show Theme:	Plus Ultra

=== 2003 ===
Winner: China
Company:	Beijing ZhongFa A.F. Consulting Co. Ltd.
Show Theme:	From January to December
Canada
Company:	Concept Fiatlux Inc.
Show Theme:	Pyrotechnic Symphony of Voices
Czech Republic
Company:	Flash Barrandov Special Effects Ltg
Show Theme:	Woman on Fire

=== 2002 ===
Winner: Canada
Company:	Concept Fiatlux Inc.
Show Theme:	The Desert Rose
Italy
Company:	Nanna Fireworks
Show Theme:	Fire into the Music
Spain
Company:	Fuegos Artificiales Antonio Caballer S.A.
Show Theme:	The Party of the Sense

=== 2001 ===
Winner: Spain
Company:	Fuegos Artificiales Antonio Caballer S.A.
Show Theme:	Soul to Fire
South Africa
Company:	Pyro Spectacular
Show Theme:	Cosmos
China
Company:	Beijing ZhongFa A.F. Consulting Co. Ltd.
Show Theme:	Odyssee

=== 2000 ===
Winner: Spain
Company:	Fuegos Artificiales Antonio Caballer S.A.
Show Theme:
Australia
Company:
Show Theme:
Italy
Company:
Show Theme:

=== 1999 ===
Winner: Spain
Company:	Fuegos Artificiales Antonio Caballer S.A.
Show Theme:	Carácter Latino
Canada
Company:	Sirius Pyrotechnics
Show Theme:	Voices of the Night
France
Company:
Show Theme:	Fascination

=== 1998 ===
Winner: Spain
Company:	Fuegos Artificiales Antonio Caballer S.A.
Show Theme:	The Mythical Land
United Kingdom
Company:	Pyro 2000
Show Theme:	Fire and Fantasy
Italy
Company:	Nanna Fireworks
Show Theme:	Voices in the Sky

=== 1997 ===
Winner: United Kingdom
Company:	Pyro 2000
Show Theme:
Canada
Company:	Sirius Pyrotechnics
Show Theme:
China
Company:	Beijing ZhongFa A.F. Consulting Co. Ltd.
Show Theme:

=== 1996 ===
Winner: Spain
Company:
Ricardo Caballer
Show Theme:

Portugal

Company:
Pirotecnia Minhota
Show Theme:

Canada

Company:
Concept Fiatlux
Show Theme:

=== 1995 ===
Winner: Portugal
Company:	Pirotecnia Minhota
Show Theme:
China
Company:	Beijing ZhongFa A.F. Consulting Co. Ltd.
Show Theme:
Italy
Company:	Parente Chieri
Show Theme:

=== 1994 ===
Winner: Italy
Company:	Parente Chiere
Show Theme:
Spain
Company:	Pirotecnia Caballer
Show Theme:
Japan
Company:	Fireworks Artists Association
Show Theme:

=== 1993 ===
winner Canada
Company:	Concept Fiatlux Inc.
Show Theme:
Italy
Company:	Parente Chieri
Show Theme:
France
Company:	Groupe F
Show Theme:

=== 1992 ===
Winner: Canada
Company:	Concept Fiatlux Inc.
Show Theme:
United Kingdom
Company:	Standard Fireworks
Show Theme:
Australia
Company:	Howard & Sons
Show Theme:

=== 1991 ===
Winner: Australia
Company:	Howard & Sons
Show Theme:
Spain
Company:	A.Caballer Llorens
Show Theme:
Hong Kong
Company:	Hop Kee
Show Theme:

=== 1990 ===
Winner: Spain
Company:	A. Caballer Llorens
Show Theme:
