= Dine Out Vancouver Festival =

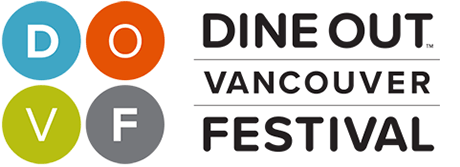
Dine Out Vancouver logo

The Dine Out Vancouver Festival, organized by Destination Vancouver, is a citywide food festival held in Vancouver. It is the largest event of its type in Canada, and attracts more than 100,000 locals and tourists to Vancouver's restaurants for 17 days each year.

The event allows diners to sample prix-fixe menus with many menus also featuring suggested BC VQA wine pairings.

== History ==
The Dine Out Vancouver Festival was first launched in January 2002 as a way to drive business to local restaurants during the industry's low season. Since then, the number of participating restaurants has increased as the festival has gained popularity.

In 2014, the festival generated more than $3.5 million in restaurant revenue. From 57 restaurants in 2003, participation in the event grew to 277 restaurants by 2015.

== Reception ==
Dine Out Vancouver has grown in popularity each year and now has a full 17-day schedule of culinary-themed events and experiences. But the event has faced some difficulties, such as long lines and slow service at the more popular restaurants.

The popularity of Asian restaurants has grown through exposure during the festival.
