= Pyrotecnico =

American fireworks company

Pyrotecnico is a professional fireworks company based in New Castle, Pennsylvania. The company was founded in 1889 by Constantino Vitale. Pyrotecnico has worked on the special effects for MTV's halftime show for Super Bowl XXXVIII in Reliant Stadium, Houston, Texas and the 2004 Democratic National Convention. Pyrotecnico was awarded with the 2008 Gold Jupiter Award representing the United States at the L'International des Feux Loto-Québec.

== History ==
In 1889 Constantino Vitale started this fireworks company in Pietramelara, Italy. In 1920 he immigrated to the United States through Ellis Island making a home for his family and company in New Castle, Pennsylvania — a small town between Pittsburgh and Cleveland that would become known as "The Fireworks Capital of America."

Constantino brought with him centuries of fireworks expertise which he taught to his apprentices, his children and grandchildren. The Vitale family developed a reputation for grand and dramatic fireworks displays.

At the turn of the century, the company was one of the largest fireworks companies in the country. By 1940 the company was headed by Constantino's son, Rocco Vitale Sr., who led the expansion of the facilities in New Castle which were also briefly used to manufacture explosives for the U.S. Navy during World War II. Many of these buildings still stand today, across the street from the corporate headquarters.

Five different generations of the Vitale family have led Constantino's company. In the 1990s the company took on the name "Pyrotecnico" to reflect the variety of products that it used to complement explosives, like confetti, streamer cannons, lighting, fog, smoke, air dancers, close proximity effects and synchronized pyrotechnics to pre-recorded audio or live performance.

For the United States Semiquincentennial, Pyrotechnico was hired by Freedom 250 to create a 4th of July fireworks show in Washington DC with 850,000 pyrotechnic effects that would attempt to be certified as the largest fireworks show ever.
