= Symphony of Fire =

International fireworks exhibition

The Symphony of Fire was an annual multi-day fireworks exhibition and friendly international competition held around the world. The fireworks were choreographed to music.

It was presented at English Bay in Vancouver, British Columbia, and at the Lake Ontario waterfront of the Ontario Place theme park in Toronto, Ontario, until 2000, when these presentations were forced to seek new sponsors; the exhibition was subsequently renamed.

The Vancouver event, re-branded as the Honda Celebration of Light, continued to run every year (except amidst COVID uncertainty in 2020 and 2021) until 2025, when it was suspended indefinitely due to a lack of stable funding.

== History ==
The event had been previously sponsored by British American Tobacco (with the branding Benson & Hedges Symphony of Fire), but once tobacco advertising restrictions were legislated by Canada's federal government in 2000, there were fears that the event would fail to receive sufficient funding to continue operations.

The Vancouver event, with various sponsors, was re-branded as the Celebration of Light and continued to operate under sponsorship from Honda.

British American Tobacco informed Ontario Place Corporation, the hosts of the Toronto exhibition, that they could continue holding the annual event, but under a different name, as the Symphony of Fire trademark vested with Benson & Hedges. The Toronto event was renamed the Canada Dry Festival of Fire; it ended in 2011.

In South Africa, the event is still marketed under the name Symphony of Fire and is sponsored by a local radio station. They were presented at Victoria & Alfred waterfront in Cape Town. The Cape Town events took place in 2000 and March 2006. Spain, Canada and South Africa took part in the 2006 event, with South Africa winning on April 8th. The event has since been cancelled.

== First events ==
- Vancouver: 25 July to 5 August 1990. Gold Jupiter Winner A. Caballer (Spain) with design by Alberto Navarro. First time using Pyrodigital Firing System.
- Toronto: 1987 at Ontario Place. 1990 Gold Jupiter Winner A. Caballer (Spain) with design by Alberto Navarro.
