= Pacific National Exhibition =

Nonprofit organization

- Official logo as of June 2023
- Status: Active
- Genre: Summer fair; Agricultural and Entertainment; Winter fair
- Dates: Mid-August to Labour Day (15 days); December (10 days)
- Frequency: Annually (Note: The event has been cancelled on several occasions since it first operated, with the event cancelled from 1942 to 1946 due to the Second World War, and again in 2020 due to the COVID-19 pandemic.)
- Locations: Hastings Park, Vancouver, British Columbia
- Coordinates: 49.2828°N 123.0366°W
- Country: Canada
- Inaugurated: August 1910; 116 years ago (summer); December 2022; 3 years ago (winter)
- Attendance: 731,708 (2019); 1.1 million (record in 1986)
- Leader: Shelley Frost (president & CEO)
- Organizer: Pacific National Exhibition (Note: The Pacific National Exhibition is an organization managed by the City of Vancouver since 2003. From 1973 to 2003, the organization was managed as a provincial crown corporation of the government of British Columbia.)
- Website: www.pne.ca

The Pacific National Exhibition (PNE) is an organization that operates an annual 15-day summer fair, 12-day winter fair, a seasonal amusement park, and indoor arenas in Vancouver, British Columbia, Canada. The PNE fair is held at Hastings Park, beginning on the third Saturday of August and ending in early September, usually Labour Day, and in mid-December until Christmas.

The organization was established in 1907 as the Vancouver Exhibition Association, and organized its first fair at Hastings Park in 1910. The organization was renamed to the Pacific National Exhibition in 1946. During the mid-20th century, a number of facilities were built on the PNE grounds, including Pacific Coliseum and PNE Agrodome. In 1993, the amusement park adjacent to the PNE, Playland, became a division of the PNE.

== History ==
The Vancouver Exhibition Association (VEA), the predecessor to the Pacific National Exhibition organization was first formed in 1907; although the association was not incorporated until 18 June 1908. The VEA had petitioned Vancouver City Council to host a fair at Hastings Park; although faced early opposition from the city council and the local jockey club that used the park for horse races. However, the city council eventually conceded to the VEA's request and granted the association a 5-year lease to host a fair at Hastings Park in 1909.

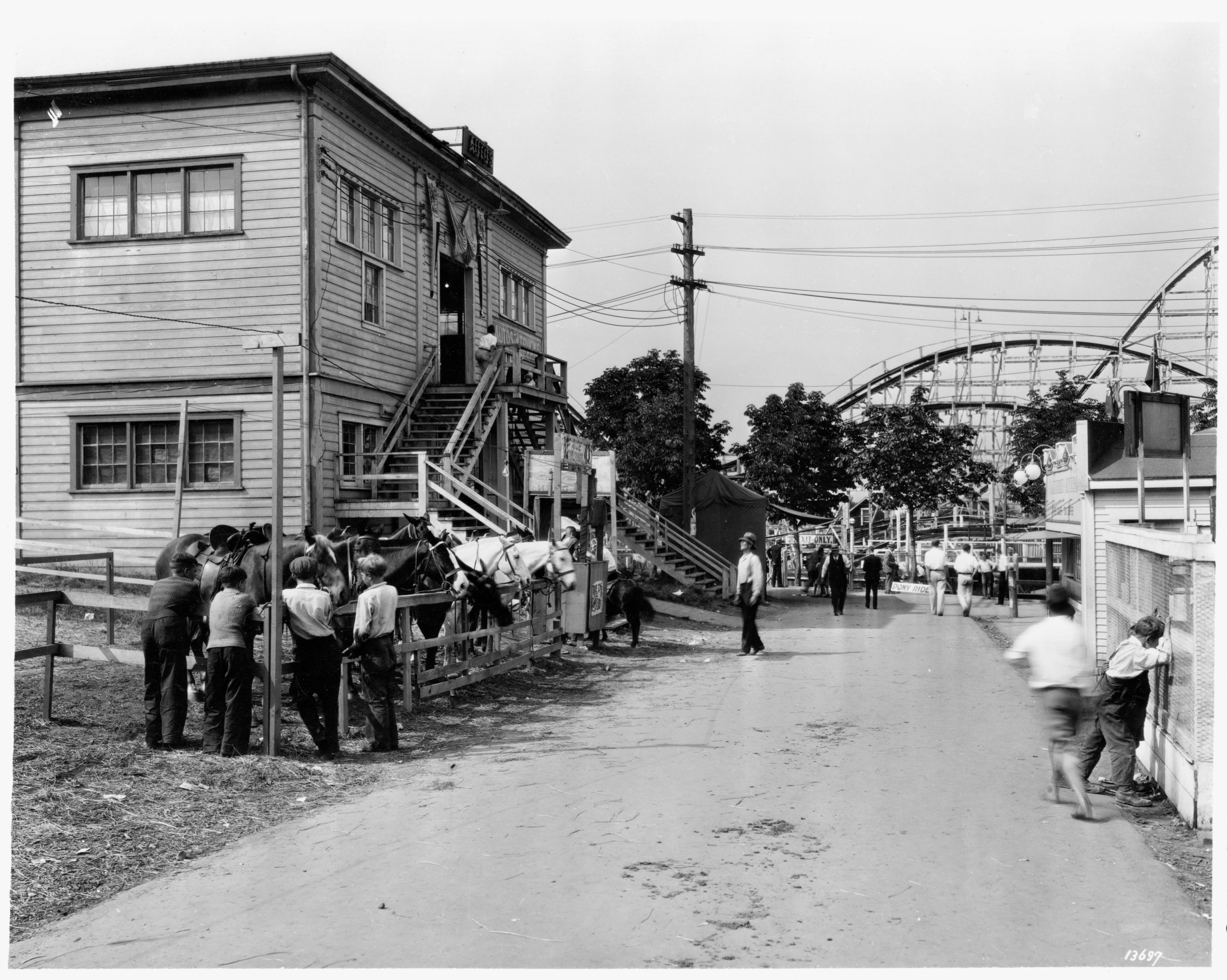
A stall offering pony rides at the Vancouver Exhibition in August 1930

The VEA held its first fair at Hastings Park in August 1910. It was opened by then Canadian Prime Minister Sir Wilfrid Laurier as the Vancouver Exhibition. The biggest attractions of the two-week fair are its numerous shops, stalls, performances, a nightly fireworks show, and the exhibition's Prize Home. From its beginnings, the exhibition was used as a showcase for the region's agriculture and economy. The fair also hosts educational displays from municipal and regional partners as well as travelling art exhibitions, like Containerart and the Van Gogh immersive experience, which vary from year to year.

In the initial years of the Second World War, the fairgrounds saw an increased military presence. However, the exhibition itself was not cancelled until 1942, after the Canadian declaration of war against Japan was issued. From 1942 to 1946 the exhibition and fair was closed, and like the Canadian National Exhibition in Toronto, served as a military training facility for the duration of World War II. During this time, the exhibition barns that were used to house livestock, were used as processing centres for interned Japanese Canadians from all over British Columbia. The interned Japanese Canadians were later shipped away to other internment camps throughout British Columbia, and Alberta. The Momiji (Japanese word for Maple) Gardens on the PNE's grounds serves as a memorial for the event. The barns used for the internment of Japanese Canadians are still used to house livestock during the annual fair, and serve as storage area to house some of the PNE's property the rest of the year. On 7 February 1946, the Vancouver Exhibition Association changed its name to its current moniker, the Pacific National Exhibition; and later reopened the fair to the public under that name in 1947. The organization was formally reincorporated as the Pacific National Exhibition in 1955.

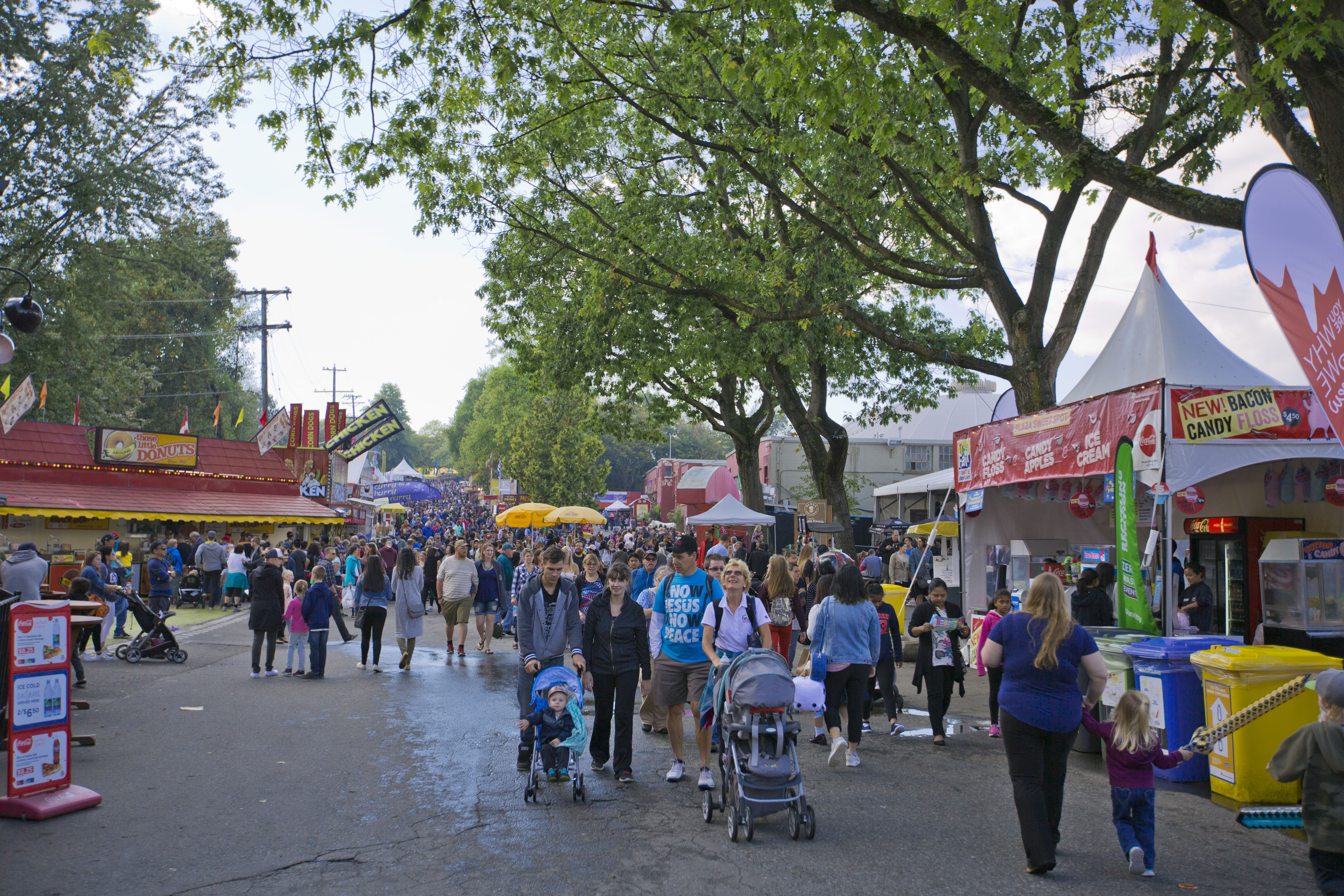
Crowds at the 2016 PNE

The highest attendance at the fair was recorded in 1986, with 1.1 million guests visiting the PNE, most likely due to Expo 86 that was occurring at the time. In 1993, the amusement park adjacent to the PNE, Playland, became a division of the PNE organization.

During 1997–1998, the PNE grounds was transformed with the demolition of a number of buildings including the Food Building, Showmart and the Poultry Building. This gave way to the Sanctuary, a parkland setting with a pond. The pond restored part of a stream that once flowed in the park out to the Burrard Inlet. The city restored a large portion of the park. Many old fair buildings have been demolished and replaced by those of a more natural character. Although land was purchased in Surrey that was to become the fair's new home, the PNE has since transferred ownership from the province to the City of Vancouver and will remain at Hastings Park. The PNE is a registered charity.

Two attractions at the PNE were named as heritage sites by the City of Vancouver in August 2013. The Pacific Coliseum and the Wooden Roller Coaster were added to the list.

In 2020, the fair went on hiatus due to the COVID-19 pandemic, alongside other agricultural and county fairs across Canada, including the Calgary Stampede, the Canadian National Exhibition, and K-Days.

It returned in 2021 with a smaller version of the fair with limited capacity

In the early hours of February 20, 2022, a major fire broke out on PNE grounds, where multiple vehicles, tools and equipment, and buildings were destroyed as a result.

=== Breakout Festival riot ===
In September 2022 the PNE Amphitheatre hosted the two day rap and hip-hop festival known as Breakout Festival. On the second day of the festival fights broke out inside and outside the venue, and vandalism occurred when concert-goers became hostile following an announcement that the headliner, American rapper Lil Baby, would not be taking the stage.

After a major police response was launched and the riot was stopped, seven people were arrested and the venue suffered millions of dollars of property damages, although no major injuries were reported. On September 19, 2023, a year after the riot, the Vancouver Police Department charged an additional 15 people with crimes related to the riot following an extensive investigation which included reviewing and analyzing video posted to social media by attendees.

== Grounds ==
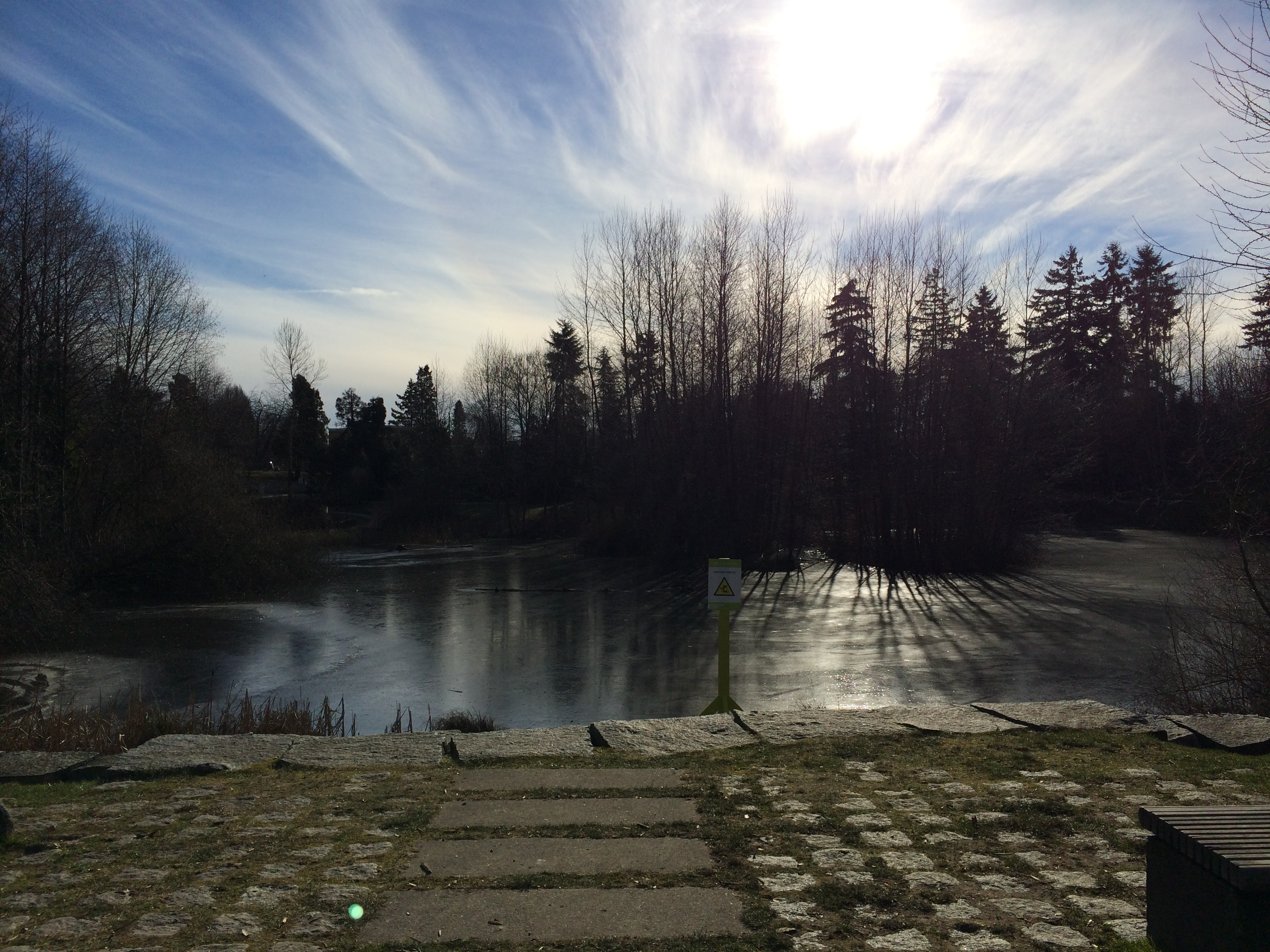
The Sanctuary at Hastings Park

The Pacific National Exhibition occupies approximately 42 hectares (105 acres) at Hastings Park, a municipal park in the Hastings–Sunrise neighbourhood. This includes the 6.1 hectares (15 acres) of land used by Playland, a PNE-operated amusement park.

The PNE grounds maintains several gardens and natural preserves on the grounds including The Sanctuary; a small pond that serves as a resting place and breeding ground for approximately 130 species of birds. Gardens at the PNE grounds include an Italian garden and Momiji Commemorative Garden; the latter serving as a memorial for the internment of Japanese Canadians during World War II. Another memorial located on the park grounds is dedicated to the 29th Battalion, (Vancouver), CEF, an infantry battalion whose lineage is perpetuated by the British Columbia Regiment (Duke of Connaught's Own).

Approximately 24 hectares (60 acres) of Hastings Park is not managed by the Pacific National Exhibition. This includes Hastings Racecourse, a 19 hectares (48 acres) facility operated by Great Canadian Entertainment; and several facilities maintained by the municipal government, including Empire Field, an emergency dispatch centre, and local community centre.

=== Structures ===
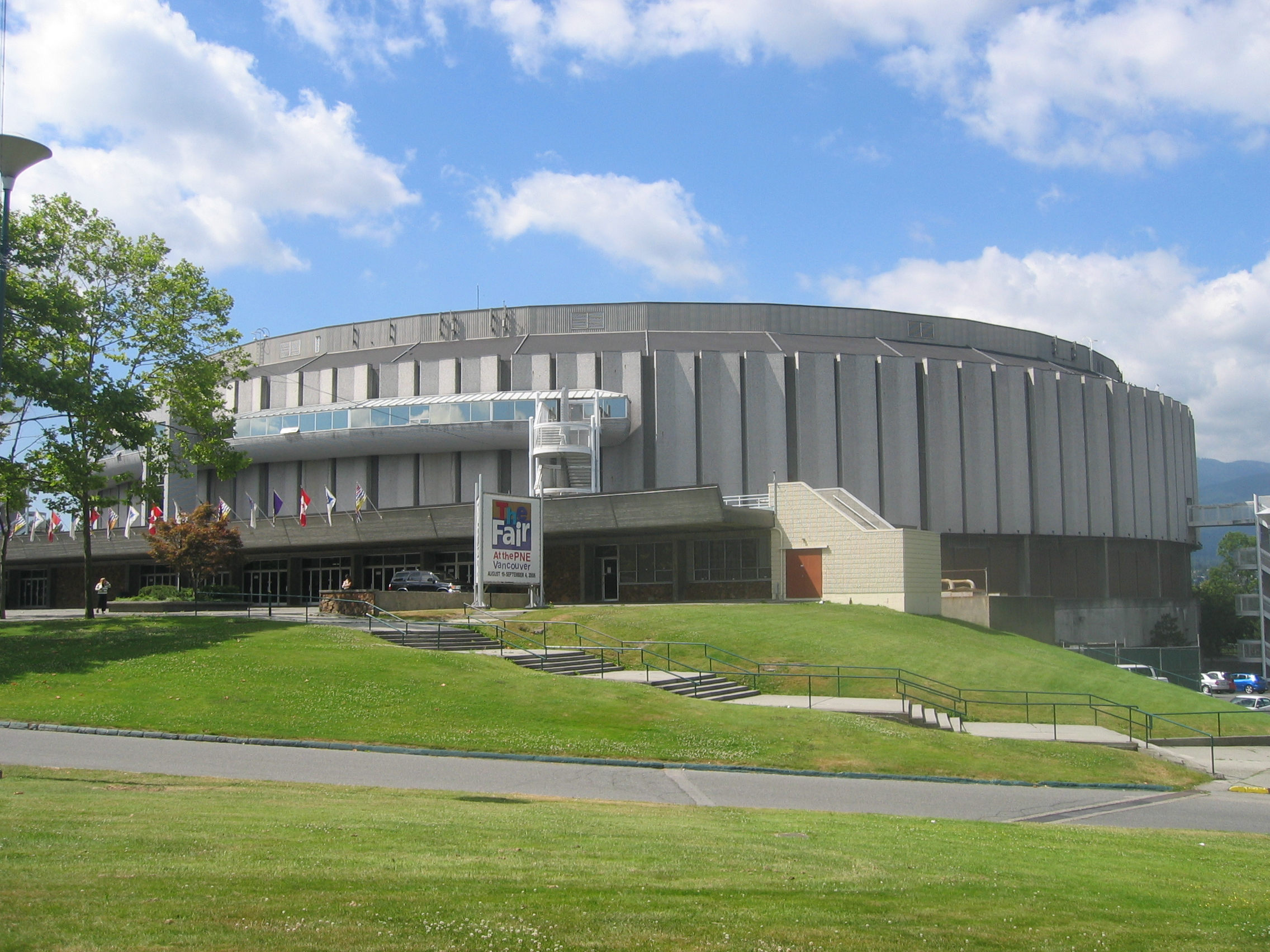
Pacific Coliseum is one of several permanent structures located at the grounds of the PNE.

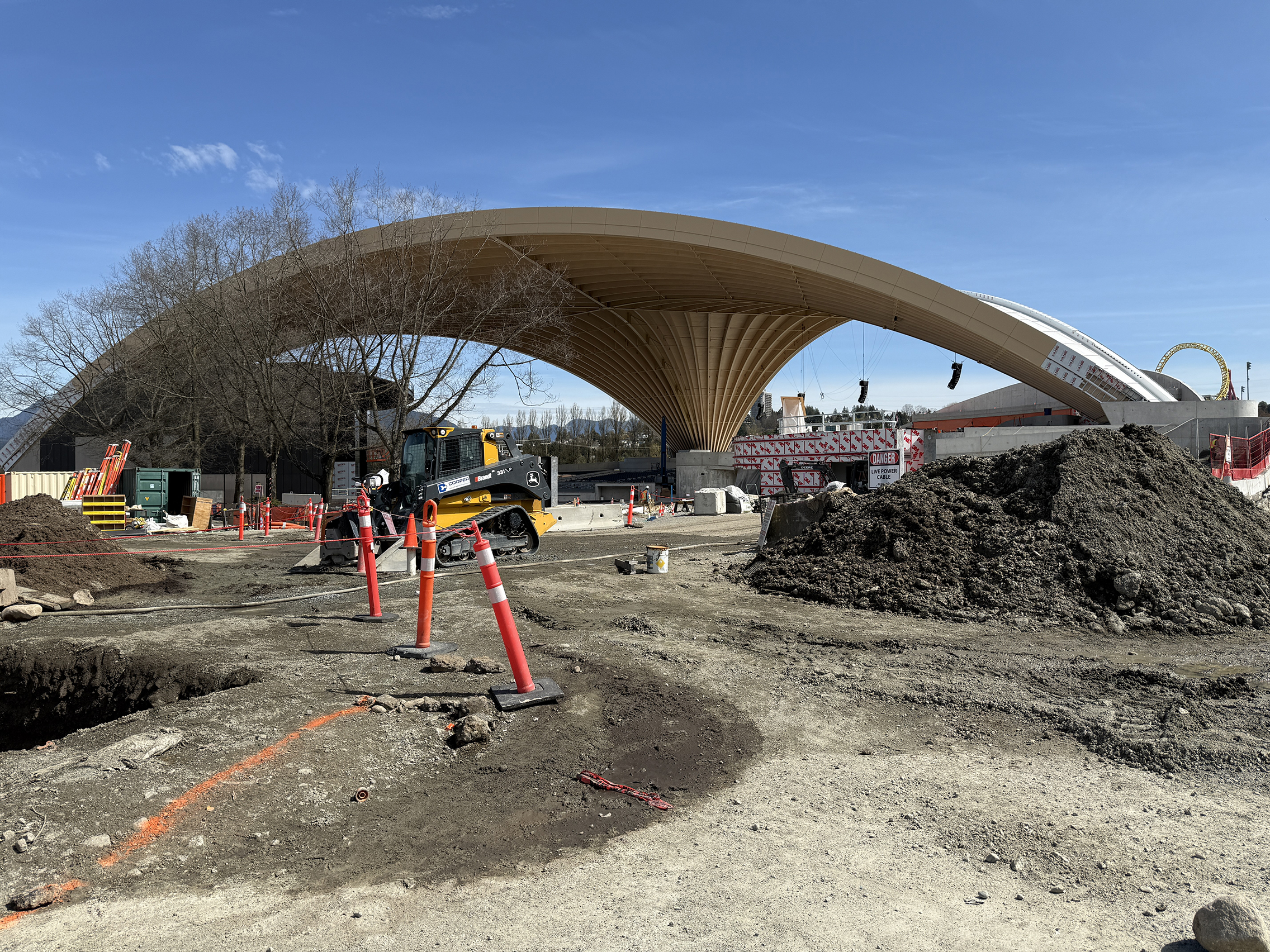
Freedom Mobile Arch construction in April, 2026

The PNE grounds contains several buildings and exhibition halls. The PNE Forum is a 4,200 square metres (45,000 sq ft) exhibition facility that is used for large displays and trade shows. Rollerland is a 1,840 square metres (19,800 sq ft) exhibition, banquet hall and venue for the Terminal City Roller Derby.

Two buildings on the PNE grounds are indoor arenas. The Pacific Coliseum is multi-purpose arena that holds 15,713 permanent seats, with provisions for 2,000 temporary seats for concerts and certain sports. The PNE Agrodome is a smaller indoor arena with 3,000 permanent seats, with provisions to expand up to 5,000 seats. Entertainment facilities includes the Garden Auditorium, a building that features a built-in stage and dance hall. The PNE grounds also features an outdoor amphitheatre named the Freedom Mobile Arch, which opened in 2026. It is the largest free-span timber frame in the world.

Other buildings on the PNE grounds includes the Livestock Barns, a large multi-use facility, and the organization's administrative offices.

==== Demolished buildings ====
- Armed Services Display Building (1950s)
- Aquarium
- Athletic Field (1910)
- Baby Dipper
- Band Stand
- 1950s BC Pavilion; later BC Sports Hall of Fame
- Dining Hall
- Dip the Dips (1915)
- Directors' Dining Room
- Display Barn
- District Display Exhibit
- Empire Stadium (1954); later Empire lot and now Empire Field (and maintained by the Vancouver Parks Board)
- Feed Store
- Ferryboat Wharf (1910)
- Food Building (a.k.a. Pure Foods Building, 1931); now part of the Sanctuary parkland
- Forestry Hall (1913)
- Fountain
- Giant Dipper
- Grandstand (1910)
- Green House
- Happyland Carousel Building
- Horticultural Building
- Industrial Building (1910); later as the Women's Building
- Livestock Judging Pavilion
- Manufacturers' Building; also Machinery Hall and later Transportation Building (1910)
- Mineral Exhibit
- Miniature Railway
- Post Office
- Poultry & Pigeon building (1950s)
- Press Bureau
- Pure Foods Building (1931) now the Italian Gardens
- Race Track and Stables (around 1905)
- Racing Paddock
- Refreshment Stands
- Sheep Stables
- Shoot the Chutes
- Showmart (1931); now part of the Italian Gardens
- Skid Road (Midway) (1910)
- Stable Restaurant
- Stock Judging Building
- Streetcar Station (1910)
- Swine Building (1950s)
- Vaudeville Stage

=== Access ===
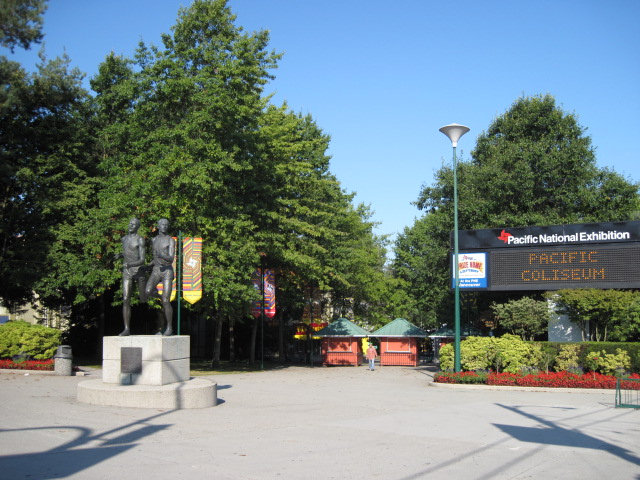
The PNE red gate, situated off East Hastings Street and Renfrew Street

The PNE grounds has several entrances or "gates," including the red gate off East Hastings Street and Renfrew Street, and the purple gate off East Hastings Street. Both gates are situated in the southern portion of the PNE grounds, with the latter gate also the main entrance to Playland. Several gates are located in the northern portion of the PNE grounds, with the yellow gate situated off Renfrew Street near the Pacific Coliseum, while the green gate is located along Miller Drive.

There exists several parking lots on site, with two parking lots off Renfrew Street and another off Bridgeway Street. The PNE also operates another parking lot south of Playland, across East Hastings. The PNE also operates a valet service for cyclists.

== See also ==
- List of festivals in Canada
- List of festivals in British Columbia
- List of festivals in Vancouver
