= Vancouver Halloween Parade & Expo =

Festival of arts and performance

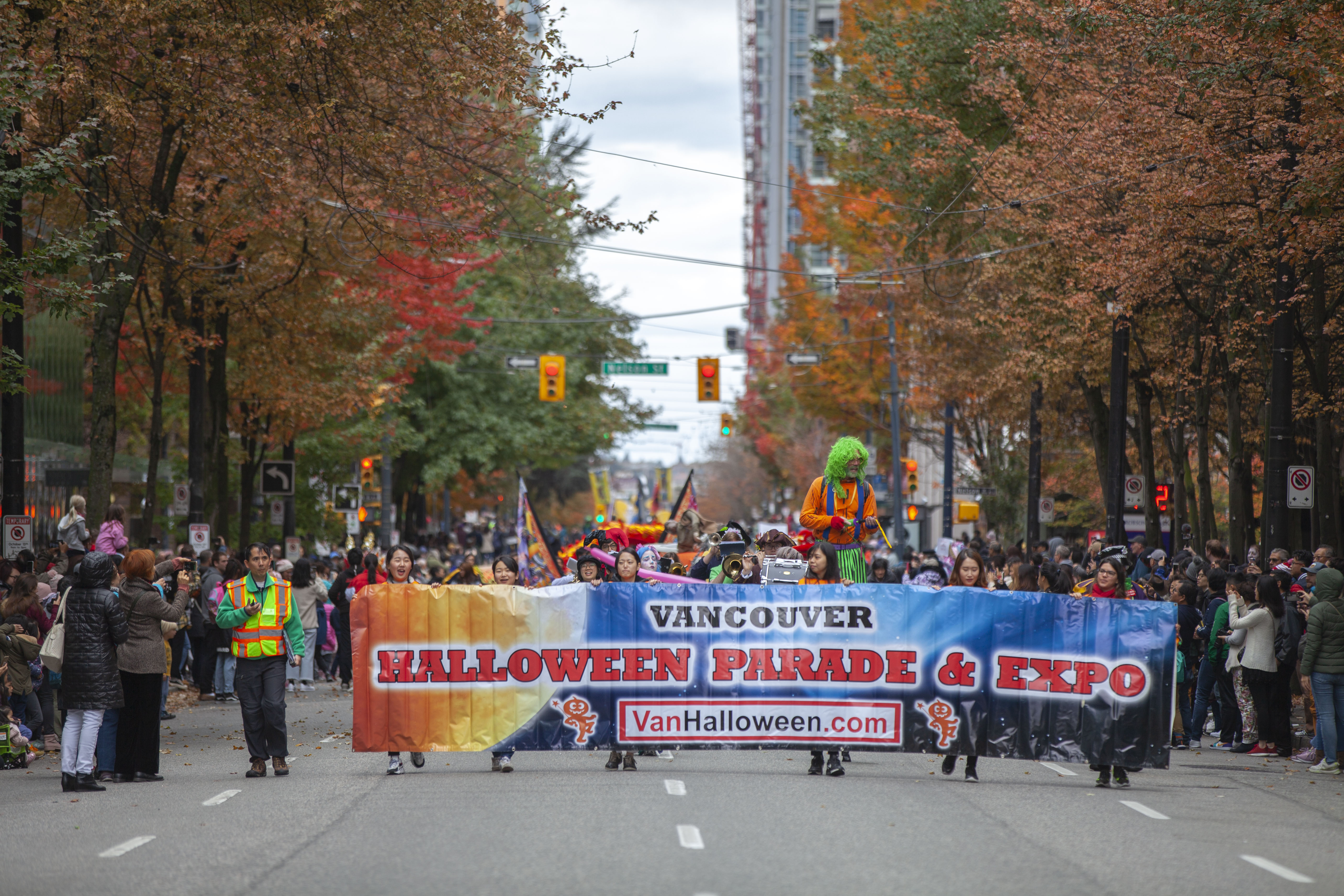
- Start of the 2019 Halloween Parade in Downtown Vancouver
- Status: Active
- Genre: comic, pop culture
- Venue: Pacific National Exhibition
- Location: Vancouver, British Columbia
- Country: Canada
- Inaugurated: 2014
- Attendance: 100,000 in 2014
- Organizer: Vancouver International Halloween Festival Society
- Website: vanhalloween.com

The Vancouver Halloween Parade & Expo was a festival of arts, performances, cosplay, comics, anime, films, costumes and makeup. The festival consists of an outdoor Parade in downtown Vancouver and an indoor Expo made of music and performing arts festival, arts exhibition and comic convention.

It was founded by International Health Council and organized by Vancouver International Halloween Festival Society to advance the public's appreciation of the arts by presenting and producing arts, visual arts, dances and performances from diverse communities while reducing blood and gore themes to celebrate and sustain Halloween heritage in family friendly and healthy direction.

== 2014 ==
The first festival took place on Oct 18 and Oct 19 in 2014. The 1.5 km parade routes include Howe St (Drake to Smithe), Smithe St (Howe to Granville) and Granville St (Smithe to Drake) in downtown Vancouver. It was the first parade in Vancouver that allows individual Cosplayers to join the parade and the first Halloween Parade in downtown Vancouver. With 2000 performers on the Parade, the Parade attracted 100,000 spectators. The 2 day Expo was held at Sheraton Vancouver Wall Centre and 7000 people attended.

== 2015 ==
The 2015 festival grows bigger and expands to 4 days from Oct 15 Thursday to Oct 18 Sunday, with performing arts in Tom Lee Music Hall, exhibitions at PNE and a grand Parade in downtown Vancouver.
