= Parade of Lost Souls =

Vancouver BC annual event

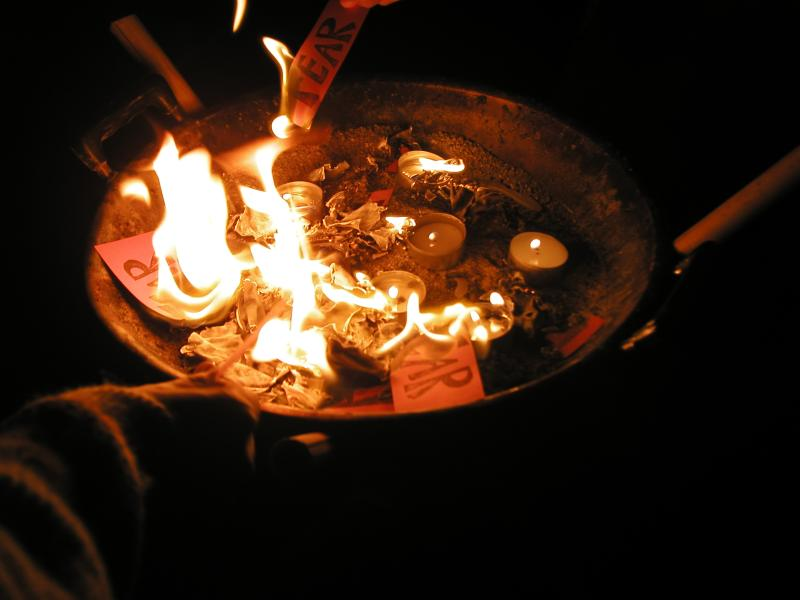
Participants symbolically burn their fear at the Parade of Lost Souls, 2002

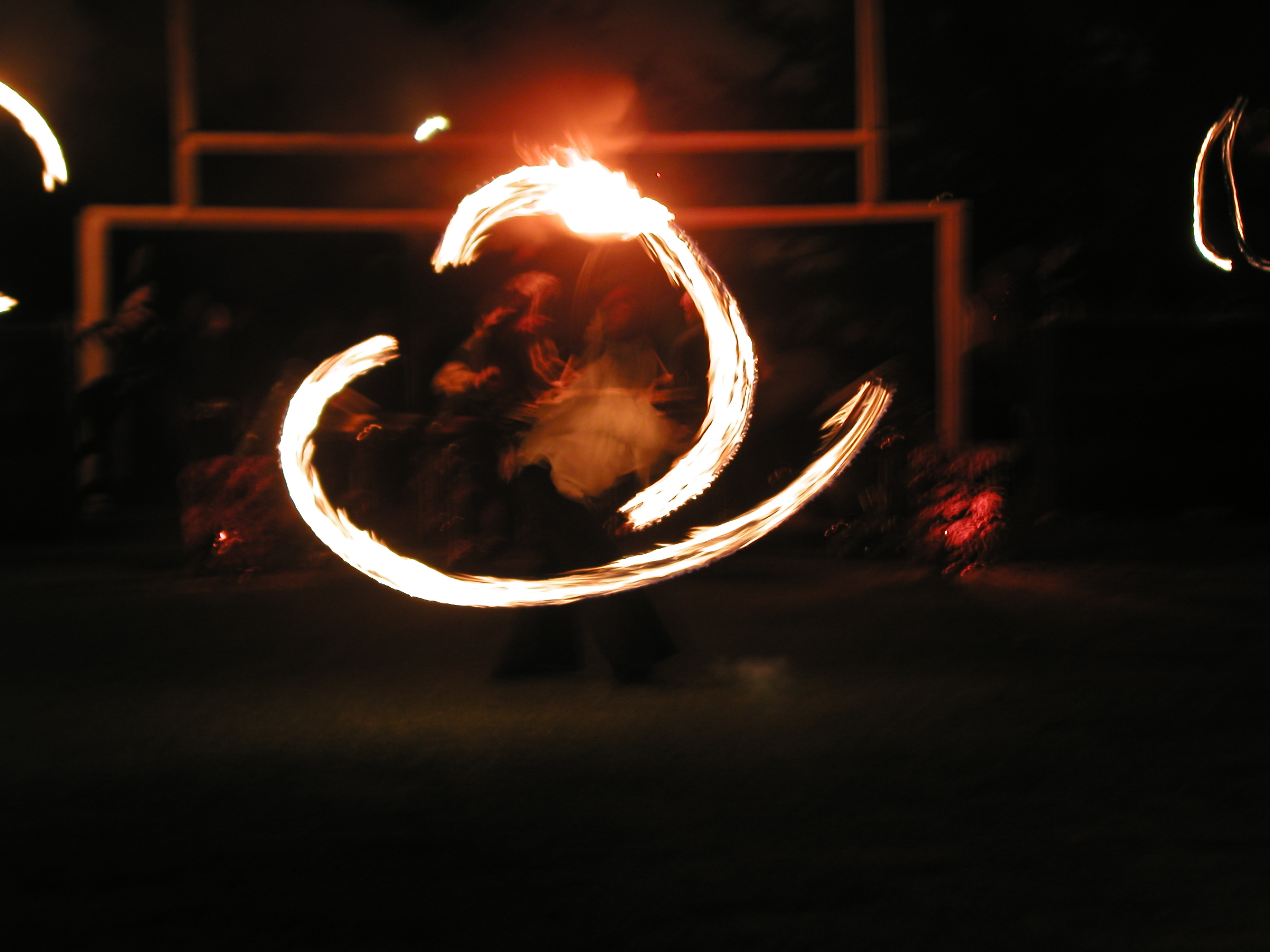
Firedancing at the Parade of Lost Souls, 2002

The Parade of Lost Souls, is an annual event in Vancouver organized by Dusty Flowerpot Cabaret, which took over in 2013 from the Public Dreams Society. It takes place in East Vancouver, at a secret location disclosed the night before. It occurs the Saturday closest to Halloween. Though it is an annual event, it did not occur in 2005 due to logistical concerns.

Originally named The Party of the Lost Souls, the event was initiated by Public Dreams under the direction of founding artistic director Paula Jardine.

The Grandview-Woodland community participates in the decoration and clean-up of the event, sometimes blurring the line between performer, volunteer, and spectator. Participants often dress in costume, bring lanterns, and build shrines in Grandview Park.
