= Gung Haggis Fat Choy =

Cultural event

Gung Haggis Fat Choy is a cultural event originating from Vancouver, BC, Canada. The name is a combination of wordplay on Scottish and Chinese words; haggis is a traditional Scottish food, while Kung Hei Fat Choi is a traditional Cantonese greeting used during the Chinese New Year.

The event originated to mark the coincidence of the Scottish cultural celebration of Robert Burns Day (January 25) with the Chinese New Year, but has come to represent a celebration of combining cultures in untraditional ways. In Vancouver, the event is characterized by music, poetry, and other performances around the city, culminating in a large banquet and party.

It has also inspired both a CBC television performance special and the Gung Haggis Fat Choy Festival, organized by the Recreation Department at Simon Fraser University.

== Origins ==
Gung Haggis Fat Choy was created in 1993 when a Simon Fraser University student Todd Wong was asked to help out with the university's annual Robbie Burns Day celebrations. Wong, a fifth-generation Canadian, quickly learned about Scottish-Canadian culture with its traditions of men wearing kilts, carrying swords, playing bagpipes, and cuisine. That year, Chinese Lunar New Year fell two days later, on January 27. Realizing that he could combine the two events, he coined the phrase and created the "Toddish McWong" persona. In 1998, Wong hosted the first Gung Haggis Fat Choy Rabbie Burns Chinese New Year Dinner as a private dinner party for 16 friends. In 1999, the first public Gung Haggis Fat Choy dinner was hosted as a fundraiser for the dragon boat team. Forty people attended.

== Recent years ==
In 2004, CBC television in BC premiered a regional television special Gung Haggis Fat Choy. It was nominated for two 2004 Leo Awards: Best Music, Comedy or Variety Program or Series (Moyra Rodger); and Best Direction in a Music, Comedy or Variety Program or Series (Moyra Rodger/Ken Stewart).

It featured music and dance performances by:

- The Paper Boys with Chinese flautist Jing Min Pan, set in the Dr. Sun Yat Sen Chinese Classical Gardens,
- Silk Road Music Ensemble in Vancouver's Chinatown,
- George Sapounidis singing in Mandarin accompanied by the Vancouver Dance Academy
- Joe McDonald's Brave Waves with LaLa on vocals

It also described the origins of Toddish McWong and Gung Haggis Fat Choy and included mini features on Rabbie Burns, Chinese New Year and haggis. The special was produced by Moyra Rodger of Out to See Entertainment, and nominated for two Leo Awards, Best Direction and Best musical/variety program.

By 2005, the event had grown to a fundraising dinner serving 570 people, and co-hosted by Shelagh Rogers, the host of national CBC Radio Sounds Like Canada morning program. The dinner event featured Asian Canadian poetry by author Fred Wah, singalongs of Scottish songs such as Scotland the Brave and Auld Lang Syne, plus new twists such as "When Asian Eyes are Smiling". Highland dancing was performed by champion dancers Vincent and Cameron Collins. Traditional haggis is served as well as deep-fried haggis won ton, and haggis lettuce wrap.

2005 also saw the start of the SFU Gung Haggis Fat Choy Festival when the Simon Fraser University Recreation department wanted to create a student-oriented event to help kick-off the Winter Semester. Owing to SFU's Scottish associations, they had already hosted an annual Robbie Burns Day celebration. Wong was invited to help create a fun event that would be of interest to the large Asian student population.

In 2007 the first Seattle Gung Haggis Fat Choy dinner was held in organized by the Caledonian and St. Andrew's Society of Seattle. These dinners have been emceed by Toddish McWong, and have featured vivid Seattle talent from the local Chinese and Scottish communities including in 2008: author Lensey Namioka, North West Junior Pipe Band, David Leong's Martial Arts & Lion Dance School, Washington Chinese Youth Orchestra, Red McWilliams "America's Celt", Susan Burk teamed Cape Breton fiddling with Highland bagpiper Don Scobie, and percussionist Ben Rudd.

A 2007 CBC documentary film, Generations: The Chan Legacy, included film footage and interviews from the dinner events. The documentary is Chinese Canadian history is told through the lives of Rev. Chan Yu Tan, a minister for the Chinese United Church, and five generations of his family descendants, including great-great-grandson Todd Wong. Film clips also featured an interview with Peter Mansbridge, host of CBC TV's The National, and Japanese-Canadian author Joy Kogawa, as Wong was instrumental in helping to save Kogawa's childhood home from demolition.

In 2008, wider recognition of Gung Haggis Fat Choy and "Toddish McWong" spread to other cultural events. The 2008 Celtic Fest in Vancouver featured as a poetic showdown between Scottish poet (Robert Burns), Irish poet (William Butler Yeats) and Welsh poet (Dylan Thomas). Wong played Burns, while actors Damon Calderwood played Thomas, and Mark Downey played Yeats.

Wong was called to Victoria's Government House in April 2008, to receive the 2008 BC Community Achievement Award presented by BC Premier Gordon Campbell and Lt. Governor Steven Point. Wong was honoured for his devotion to community service, building bridges and cross-cultural understanding, and acknowledged as the creator of Gung Haggis Fat Choy.

The Royal BC Museum recognized Gung Haggis Fat Choy in 2008, as part of the Free Spirit exhibit celebrating the province's 150 years of history. A picture from the 2008 Gung Haggis Fat Choy dinner was included in an exhibition of food through BC's history. In August 2008, Todd Wong was voted as one of 150 of BC's most interesting people, joining such colourful historical figures.

January 25, 2009, marked the convergence of the 250th anniversary of the birth of Robert Burns and Chinese New Year's Eve. The Gung Haggis Fat Choy Robbie Burns Chinese New Year's Eve dinner took place on Sunday, January 25, 2009, when the Year of the Ox began on January 26. The next convergence of Robbie Burns Day and Chinese New Year's will be in 2020, when The Year of Rat lands on January 25, the 261st birthday of Robert Burns.

== Scotland ==
Gung Haggis Fat Choy has spread to Scotland and throughout the Chinese community. Wong has been interviewed by Sing Tao Daily news, Ming Pao, CBC radio and television, The Scotsman.com and BBC Radio Scotland. He has appeared on cooking shows such as City TV's City Cooks with host Simi Sara, and BBC Radio's Scotland Licked and The Radio Cafe.

For Homecoming Year Scotland, a picture of Todd Wong dressed in "Gung Haggis Fat Choy" costume (kilt and Chinese Lion mask) was featured in the This Is Who We Are: Scots in Canada travelling photo exhibition. The project finished with a special closing night reception at Scottish Parliament, attended by Wong where he was introduced by project organizer Harry McGrath to Scottish First Minister Alex Salmond.

== Dragon boat team ==
Gung Haggis Fat Choy dragon boat team, which is coached Wong, is dedicated to fun and multiculturalism and hosts the Gung Haggis Fat Choy Robbie Burns Chinese New Year Dinner event. The dinner event started as a fundraiser for the dragon boat team, and has expanded to include other non-profit causes which organizer Todd Wong is involved in. The team competes at dragon boat races and festivals in BC, Washington and Oregon. Their uniform includes kilts featuring the Fraser Hunting (sport) tartan, and a red team shirt decorated with Chinese style "lucky" gold coins. They are responsible for hosting the dragon boat parade float in Vancouver's annual St. Patrick's Day parade. The team has been featured in television documentaries for France 3, ZDF German Public Television and CBC Television. On February 25, 2008, the team was featured on local Global News as part of a news series highlighting what makes BC world class.
