= Vancouver International Digital Festival =

Canadian digital media event

The Vancouver International Digital Festival is an annual event for creative professionals working in digital media. Held for the last four years in Vancouver, British Columbia, Canada, the event includes an international business partnering forum, industry parties, digital entertainment screenings, conference sessions on the latest trends and markets for digital media, and educational workshops for creators, designers, and producers in games, mobile, animation, film, and interactive design.

== Past speakers ==
- Nolan Bushnell, The founder of Atari, Pong Creator, and CEO/Founder of uWink, Inc.
- Don Mattrick, president of Electronic Arts
- Terry McBride, CEO of the Nettwerk Music Group
- George Oates, Principal Designer of Flickr
- Mark Pesce, Honorary Associate, University of Sydney and author of The Playful World: How Technology is Transforming Our Imagination
- Joshua Davis, Designer
- John Schappert, Senior Vice President and General Manager, Electronic Arts Canada
- Sander Schwartz, President of Warner Bros. Animation
- Malcolm Garrett, Creative Director, AIG (Applied Information Group)
