= Eat! Vancouver =

Food festival in Vancouver, Canada

Eat! Vancouver is the largest consumer food festival in Canada. It takes place annually in Vancouver, British Columbia. The three-day festival is held at BC Place, and showcases restaurants and food suppliers from British Columbia and across Canada. Chefs compete in several cooking competitions; one is for apprentice chefs, the Junior Culinary Competition.

== History ==
Founded by George Acs and Heather Angeard, the first Eat! Vancouver festival took place in 2003 at BC Place; that year, there were 12 chefs and 95 exhibitors. The 2005 festival had 30 celebrity chefs using three stages, and added an annual barbecue and chili competition which had previously run separately at Westminster Quay since the 1990s.

In 2011 the festival moved to the Vancouver Convention Centre, but returned to BC Place in 2012.

2020 saw the event go on hiatus until 2021.
