= Vancouver International Dance Festival =

The Vancouver International Dance Festival is an annual, month-long contemporary dance festival held in Vancouver, British Columbia. The festival, produced by Kokoro Dance Theatre Society, began in 1998 as a Butoh Festival. The following year it became the Vancouver International Dance Festival.
