= Vancouver Cherry Blossom Festival =

Annual spring festival in Vancouver, British Columbia, Canada

The Vancouver Cherry Blossom Festival (VCBF) is an annual spring festival held in Vancouver, British Columbia, Canada to celebrate the city's cherry trees. The festival’s fundamental objectives include public education through seasonal, cherry-themed citywide viewing programs, musical performances, and fine art and craft exhibitions.

== History ==
The Vancouver Cherry Blossom Festival was founded in 2005 by Linda Poole, its executive director, to commemorate the 800 cherry (also known as sakura in Japanese) trees gifted to the city by Japan.

Since then, Vancouver has over 40,000 cherry trees as of 2023. The festival incorporates bike rides, cherry blossom viewing tours, and traditional Japanese festivities.

In 2020, the festival went on hiatus due to the COVID-19 pandemic. From 1 to 25 April 2021, the 15th annual Vancouver Cherry Blossom Festival ran virtually.
