= Vancouver Asian Film Festival =

Film festival

- Location: Vancouver, British Columbia, Canada
- Language: International
- Website: Official website

The Vancouver Asian Film Festival (VAFF) is an annual film festival held in Vancouver, British Columbia for about 4–5 days in November. Launching in 1996, it is Canada’s oldest Asian film festival, exhibiting films and videos by North American artists of Asian heritage. It was founded in 1995 and debuted in September 1997.

Awards include a juried award for Best Canadian Short. Categories include: Narrative (i.e. drama, comedy, romance), Documentary, Animation, and Experimental. Visiting artists have included Tzi Ma, Osric Chau, Ham Tran, Justin Lin, Michael Kang and Jessica Yu, as well as BC filmmakers, Mina Shum and Julia Kwan. The festival has been host to stars such as Grace Park and others.

VAFF is a not-for-profit organization. VAFF is entirely organized and produced by volunteers, with financial support from corporate sponsors, public funders and private donors.

== Ultra Shorts Competition ==
- Reckless Coast Pictures 15 Seconds Of Mukbang (Ultimate Fan Choice Award)
- Mama Says
- KoreanCanuck
