= Vancouver International Burlesque Festival =

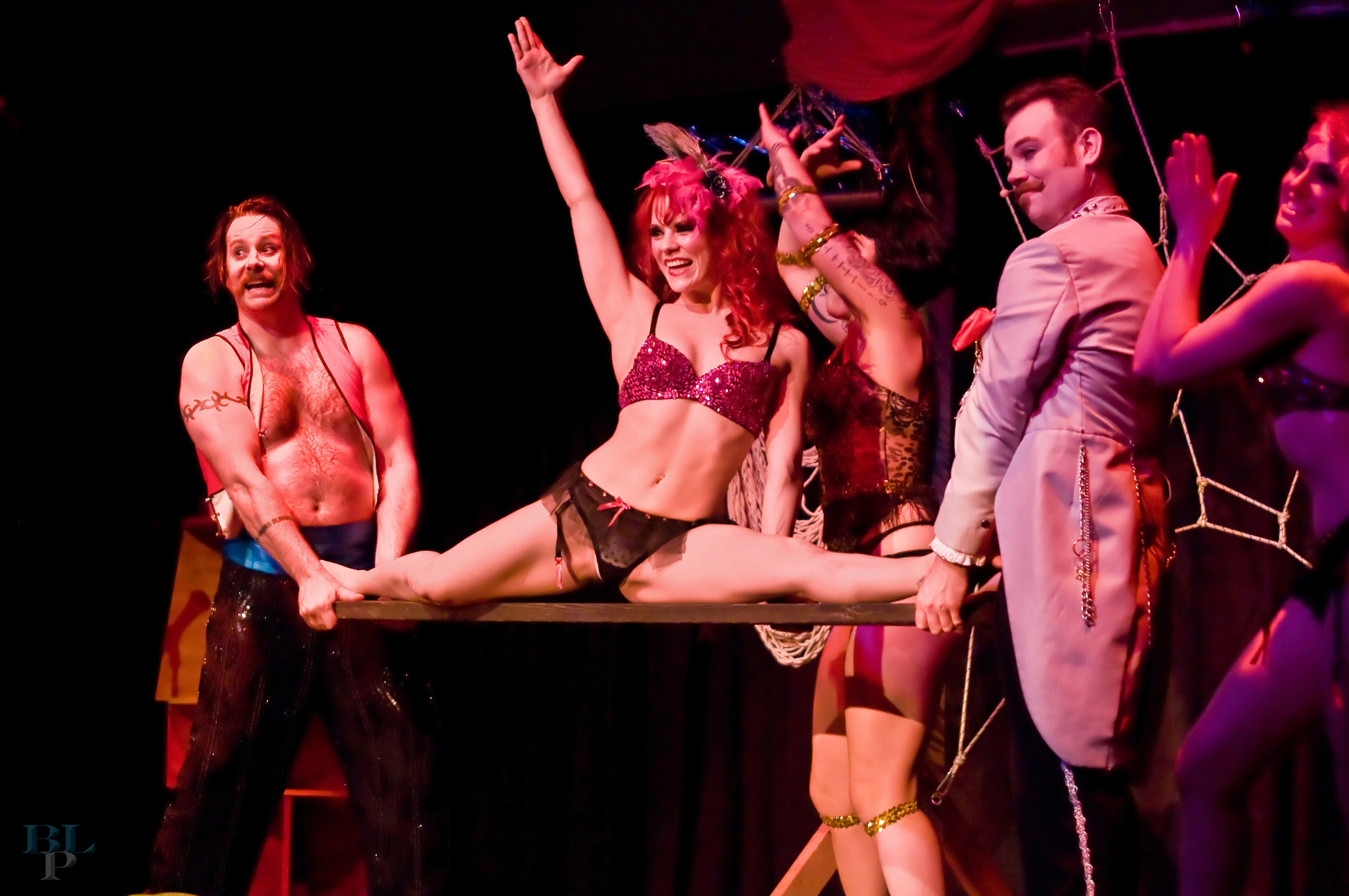
- Performers onstage at the 2011 VIBF.
- Location: Vancouver, B.C., Canada
- Founded: 2006
- Founded by: Screaming Chicken Theatrical Society, Sweet Soul Burlesque Ltd.
- Type of plays: Burlesque, neo-burlesque, vaudeville
- Festival date: April 1-6, 2025
- Website: http://www.vibf.ca/

The Vancouver International Burlesque Festival is an annual four-day festival that takes place every spring in Vancouver, British Columbia, Canada. The festival features burlesque performers, comedians and musicians. The 2017 festival showcases was held at the Vancouver Playhouse (theatre venue) on March 31 & April 1, with Tit Talks at The Post at 750 on March 30, and The Diamonds in the Buff Industry awards on March 29. The 2018 festival dates was April 4–7.

== History ==
The first festival took place in February 2006 and was founded by two local troupes; The Screaming Chicken Theatrical Society and Sweet Soul Burlesque. Performances were held at the Red Room, the Chinese Cultural Center and the Burr Theatre. Festival production was returned to the community, leading to the founding of the Vancouver International Burlesque Festival Association (VIBFA).

Success of the first festival led to an expanded second year featuring two stages and workshops. The new event platform included cross-collaboration opportunities and workshops, and produced events such as movie nights, discussion panels and fashion shows focusing on the art of neo-burlesque. The 2008 Festival ran for ten days, and attracted over 100 singers, dancers, comedians, musicians, filmmakers, and costume designers from around the world.

== Vancouver International Burlesque Festival Association (VIBFA) ==
The VIBFA is a not-for-profit elected board whose primary goal is to produce a festival that focuses on the Vancouver burlesque scene and the world of burlesque on an international level.

=== 2025 Team ===
- Androsia Wilde - Artistic Director
- Charlotte Strudel - President
- Lizzy Tush - Treasurer
- Selene Ophelia - Secretary
- Bonita Bunda - Member at Large
- Sally Limón - Member at Large

== Venues ==
Past venues include the Rio Theatre and the Vogue Theatre. The 2016 festival will take place at the Vancouver Playhouse.

== Performers ==
Past notable performers include Jo Boobs (New York City, New York) and Burlesque Hall of Fame inductee Judith Stein.
