= List of music festivals in Canada =

Music festivals of Canada
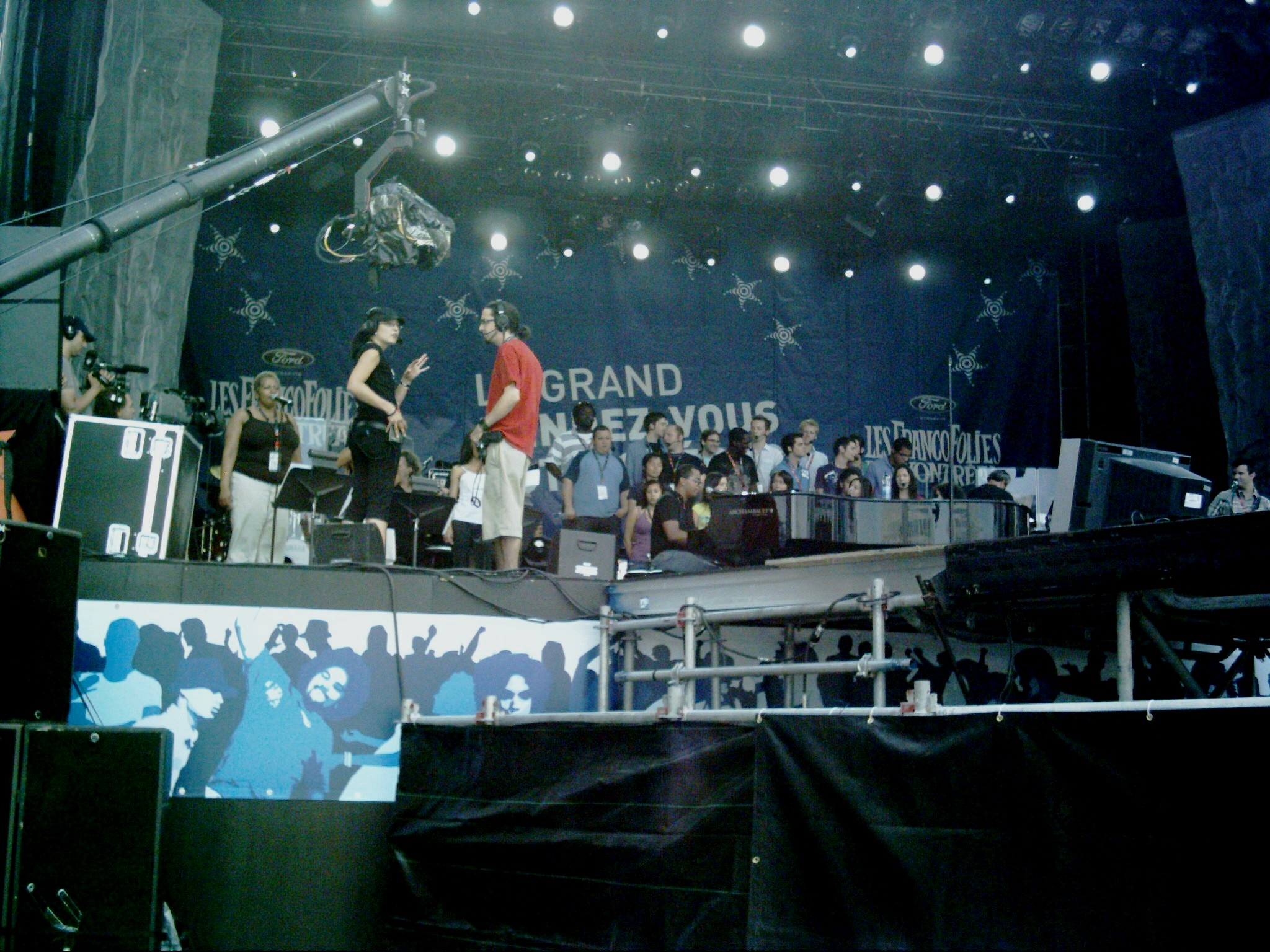

External sublists
- By type: Blues festivals of Canada

Regional types
- bluegrass festival; pow wow

Related topics
- Festivals of Canada; music festivals of North America; lists of music festivals by country (Greenland; United States); music in Canada; tourism in Canada

This is an incomplete list of music festivals in Canada.

== Sublists ==
=== By type ===
- List of classical music festivals#North America
- List of electronic music festivals
- List of folk festivals#Canada
  - List of blues festivals in Canada
- List of jazz festivals#Canada

== Music festivals ==
=== Sortable table ===
Festival name	City/venue	Province	1st year	Genre/type
Action Music Fest	Summerland	British Columbia		
Adstock	Maple Ridge	British Columbia		
Amnesia Rockfest	Montebello	Quebec	2005	Rock festival
Armstrong Metal Fest	Armstrong	British Columbia		Heavy metal festival
Astral Harvest Music & Arts Festival	Driftpile	Alberta		Arts festival
Bass Coast	Merritt	British Columbia		
Beaches International Jazz Festival	Toronto	Ontario		Jazz festival
Big Sky Music Festival	Oro-Medonte	Ontario		
Boots and Hearts Music Festival	Oro-Medonte	Ontario		Country music festival
Bushwacked	Beaverdell	British Columbia		
Calgary Folk Music Festival	Calgary	Alberta		Folk festival
Calgary International Blues Festival	Calgary	Alberta		Blues festival
Calgary International Reggae Festival	Calgary	Alberta		Reggae festival
Canadian Music Week	Toronto	Ontario		
Canmore Folk Fest	Canmore	Alberta		Folk festival
Capital Hoedown	Ottawa	Ontario		Country music festival
Cavendish Beach Music Festival	Cavendish	Prince Edward Island	2009	Country music festival
CBC Music Festival	Toronto	Ontario	2013	
Celtic Colours	Cape Breton Island	Nova Scotia	1997	Celtic music festival
Centre of Gravity	Kelowna	British Columbia	2008	
Chasing Summer	Calgary	Alberta	2012	Electronic dance music
Choral Mosaic 2020	Mississauga	Ontario	2020	Choral ensemble
CityFolk Festival	Ottawa	Ontario		
Classics by the Bay	Parrsboro	Nova Scotia		classical music festival
CMT Music Fest	Kitchener	Ontario		
Come Together Music Festival	Durham	Ontario		
Contact Winter Music Festival	Vancouver	British Columbia		Teen friendly
Connect Music Festival	Mortlach	Saskatchewan		
Craven Country Jamboree	Regina Qu'Appelle Valley	Saskatchewan		
Dawson City Music Festival	Dawson City	Yukon		
Desert Live Music Festival	Osoyoos	British Columbia		
Digital Dreams Music Festival	Toronto	Ontario		
Dream Music Festival	Penticton	British Columbia		
East Van Summer Jam	Vancouver	British Columbia		
Edgefest	Toronto and Barrie	Ontario		
Edmonton Folk Music Festival	Edmonton	Alberta		
Electric Eye Music Festival	Lethbridge	Alberta		
Enderby Arts Festival	Enderby	British Columbia		
Escapade Music Festival	Ottawa	Ontario	2010	Electronic dance music
Ever After Music Festival	Kitchener	Ontario		
Evolve Festival	Atlantic Canada			
Fest of Ale	Penticton	British Columbia		
Festival d'été de Québec	Quebec City	Quebec	1968	
Festival of Small Halls		Prince Edward Island		Music and dance festival at various locations featuring folk/country/indie artists
Festivent de Lévis	Lévis	Quebec		
FestiVoix de Trois-Rivières	Trois-Rivières	Quebec		
Funtastic	Vernon	British Columbia		
Fusion Festival	Surrey	British Columbia		
Future Forest Music & Arts Festival	Outside of Fredericton	New Brunswick		Electronic dance music
Gateway Music Festival	Bengough	Saskatchewan		
Goderich Celtic Roots Festival	Goderich	Ontario		
Golden West Music Fest	Bonnyville	Alberta		
GrizFest	Tumbler Ridge	British Columbia		
The Groove Music Festival	Midway	British Columbia		
Halifax Jazz Festival	Halifax	Nova Scotia		
Halifax Pop Explosion	Halifax	Nova Scotia		
Harrison Festival	Harrison Hot Springs	British Columbia		
Harvest Jazz and Blues Festival	Fredericton	New Brunswick		
Havelock Country Jamboree	London	Ontario		
Heavy Montréal	Montreal	Quebec		
Hillside Festival	Guelph Lake	Ontario		
Hornby Island Festival	Hornby Island	British Columbia		
Home County Folk Festival	London	Ontario		
Igloofest	Gatineau	Quebec	2025	Electronic dance music
Igloofest	Montreal	Quebec	2007	Electronic dance music
Indie Week Canada	Toronto	Ontario	2002	Music festival and industry conference
Innu Nikamu	Mani-Utenam	Quebec	1985	First Nations music
Island Musicfest	Comox Valley	British Columbia		
Islands Music Festival	Duncan	British Columbia		
Jazz Winnipeg Festival	Winnipeg	Manitoba		
The Junction Summer Solstice Festival	Toronto	Ontario		
Love & Records - Lethbridge Music Festival & Record Fair	Lethbridge	Alberta		
Lunenburg Folk Harbour Festival	Lunenberg	Nova Scotia		
Manitoulin Country Fest	Little Current	Ontario		
Mariposa Folk Festival	Orillia	Ontario		
Maritime Fiddle Festival	Dartmouth	Nova Scotia	1950	Folk music/Step Dance festival
MazzFest	Saskatoon	Saskatchewan		
Mission Folk Festival	Mission	British Columbia		
Montreal International Jazz Festival	Montreal	Quebec		
Montreal International Reggae Festival	Montreal	Quebec		
MoSo Fest	Saskatoon	Saskatchewan		
Motion Notion	Golden	British Columbia		
Mushtari Begum Festival	New Westminster	British Columbia		
Music and Beyond	Ottawa	Ontario		
MusicFest Canada				
MUTEK	Montreal	Quebec		
Nakusp Music Fest	Nakusp	British Columbia		
Ness Creek Music Festival	Big River	Saskatchewan		
North by Northeast	Toronto	Ontario		
Northern Lights Festival Boreal	Sudbury	Ontario	1972	
La Nuit sur l'étang	Sudbury	Ontario		
OM Festival	Southern Ontario	Ontario		
Open Air Performances	Lake Country	British Columbia		
Osheaga Festival	Montreal	Quebec		
Ottawa Bluesfest	Ottawa	Ontario	1994	
Ottawa Chamber Music Festival	Ottawa	Ontario		
Ottawa Jazz Festival	Ottawa	Ontario		
Ottawa Reggae Festival	Ottawa	Ontario		
Paradise Music Festival	Whitehorse	Yukon		
Pop Montreal	Montreal	Quebec		
Purple City Music Festival	Edmonton	Alberta	2013	Rock, punk, shoegaze, post-punk, hardcore, metal, etc
Regina Folk Festival	Regina	Saskatchewan		
Reignbough Fiddle Arts & Music Festival	Smoky Lake	Alberta		
River Rats Festival	Athabasca	Alberta		
Riverside Festival	Gatineau	Quebec	2013	Electronic dance music
Rockin’ River Musicfest	Merritt	British Columbia		Rock festival
Rockin' the Fields of Minnedosa	Minnedosa	Manitoba		Rock festival
Rock the Shores	Victoria	British Columbia		Rock festival
Pretty Good Not Bad	Victoria	British Columbia		Experimental Electronic Music and art
Rock of the Woods Music Festival	Cowichan Valley	British Columbia		Rock festival
Salmon Arm Roots and Blues Festival	Salmon Arm	British Columbia		Blues festival
Sappyfest	Sackville	New Brunswick		
Sarnia Bayfest	Sarnia	Ontario		
Sasktel Saskatchewan Jazz Fest	Saskatoon	Saskatchewan		Jazz festival
SCENE Music Festival	St. Catharines	Ontario		
Shambhala	Salmo	British Columbia		Electronic dance music
Shorefest	Vancouver	British Columbia		
Sled Island	Calgary	Alberta		
Sommo Fest	Cavendish	Prince Edward Island	2023	Indie music
Sooke River Bluegrass Festival	Sooke	British Columbia		Bluegrass festival
Squamish Constellation Festival	Squamish	British Columbia		
Stan Rogers Folk Festival	Canso	Nova Scotia		
Steamboat Mountain Music Festival	Edgewater	British Columbia		
Summerfest	Charlottetown	Prince Edward Island		
Sunfest	London	Ontario		
Supercrawl	Hamilton	Ontario		
Tdot Fest	Toronto	Ontario		
Time Festival	Toronto	Ontario		
Tiny Lights Festival	Ymir	British Columbia		
Toronto Jazz Festival	Toronto	Ontario		
Unity Electro Fest	Quebec City	Quebec		Electronic dance music
Unity Music Festival	Slocan	British Columbia		
Up Here Festival	Sudbury	Ontario		
Vancouver Folk Music Festival	Vancouver	British Columbia		
Vancouver International Jazz Festival	Vancouver	British Columbia		
VELD Music Festival	Toronto	Ontario	2012	Electronic dance music
Victoria Ska Fest	Victoria	British Columbia		
Virgin Festival	Toronto and Vancouver			
Wanderlust Festival	Whistler	British Columbia		
Wapiti Music Festival	Fernie	British Columbia		Folk / Indie / Rock
Warped Tour	Various	Various		
WEMF	Toronto	Ontario		
WestFest	Calgary	Alberta		
Wild Mountain Music Festival	Hinton	Alberta		
Winnipeg Folk Festival	Winnipeg	Manitoba	1974	Folk festival
Winnipeg New Music Festival	Winnipeg	Manitoba	1992	Contemporary classical music festival
Whoop & Hollar Folk Festival	Portage la Prairie	Manitoba	2015	Folk festival (Alternative / Blues / Francophone / Folk / Indie / Indigenous / Pop / Rock / Roots / World)

=== Organized by province or territory ===
- Lilith Fair, a traveling festival

==== Alberta ====
- Astral Harvest, Driftpile
- Beaumont Music Festival, Beaumont
- Big Valley Jamboree, Camrose
- Block Heater Festival, Calgary
- Blues on Whyte Block Party, Edmonton
- Calgary Folk Music Festival, Calgary
- Calgary International Blues Festival, Calgary
- Canmore Folk Festival, Canmore
- Chasing Summer Music Festival, Calgary
- Country Thunder Alberta, Calgary
- Edmonton Folk Music Festival, Edmonton
- Jasper Folk Music Festival, Jasper
- North Country Fair, Driftpile
- Pigeon Lake Concert Series, Mulhurst Bay
- Pigeon Lake Music Festival, Mulhurst Bay
- Reignbough Fiddle Arts & Music Festival, Smoky Lake
- Rockin' Thunder Alberta, Edmonton
- Scream Halloween, Edmonton
- Sled Island, Calgary
- South Country Fair, Fort Macleod
- Sasquatch Gathering, Rangeton Park, Evansburg
- TD Edmonton International Jazz Festival, Edmonton
- The Warm Up, Canmore
- Up and DT Festival, Edmonton
- Wild Mountain Music Festival, Hinton
- Loud As Hell Open Air Metal Festival, Drumheller
- Decimate Metal Festival, Millet

==== British Columbia ====
- CannaFest Music Festival, Grand Forks
- Constellation Festival, Squamish
- FVDED In the Park, Surrey
- Shambhala Music Festival, Shambhala
- ValhallaFest, Terrace
- Vancouver Folk Music Festival, Vancouver
- Wapiti Music Festival, Fernie
- Glacial Mutilation Metal Festival, Vancouver
- Armstrong Metal Festival, Armstrong
- Hyperspace Metal Festival, Vancouver

==== Manitoba ====
- Big Fun Festival, Winnipeg
- Harvest Moon Festival, Clearwater
- Jazz Winnipeg Festival, Winnipeg
- Manitoba Electronic Music Exhibition, Winnipeg
- Matlock Festival of Music Art and Nature, Matlock
- Rainbow Trout Music Festival, St. Malo
- Real Love Summer Fest, Teulon
- sākihiwē festival, Winnipeg
- Winnipeg Folk Festival, Winnipeg
- Winnipeg Music Festival, Winnipeg
- Winnipeg New Music Festival, Winnipeg
- Whoop & Hollar Folk Festival, Portage la Prairie
- YES FEST, Winnipeg
- Manitoba Metal Festival, Winnipeg

==== New Brunswick ====
- List of festivals in New Brunswick

==== Newfoundland and Labrador ====
- Tuckamore Festival, St. John's
- Churchill Park Music Festival, St.John's
- Iceberg Alley Performance Tent, St.John's
- George Street Festival, St.John's

==== Northwest Territories ====
- Folk on the Rocks

==== Nova Scotia ====
- Evolve Festival, Antigonish
- Halifax Pop Explosion, Halifax
- Maritime Fiddle Festival, Dartmouth

==== Ontario ====
- Big Music Fest, Belleville and Owen Sound
- Burlington's Sound of Music Festival, Burlington
- Canadian Music Week, Toronto
- Capital Hoedown, Ottawa
- Capital Idea!, Ottawa
- Choral Mosaic 2020, Mississauga
- CMT Music Fest, Kitchener
- CityFolk Festival, Ottawa
- Escapade Music Festival, Ottawa
- Ever After Music Fest, Kitchener
- Field Trip, Toronto
- Forge Fest, Tillsonburg
- Hillside Festival, Guelph
- Line Spike 2025, Harrowsmith
- Music and Beyond, Ottawa
- North by Northeast, Toronto
- Northern Lights Festival Boréal, Sudbury
- Ottawa Bluesfest, Ottawa
- Ottawa Chamber Music Festival, Ottawa
- Ottawa International Animation Festival, Ottawa
- Ottawa International Jazz Festival, Ottawa
- OVO Fest, Toronto
- RiverFest Elora, Elora
- Summerfolk Music and Crafts Festival, Owen Sound
- Supercrawl, Hamilton
- VELD Music Festival, Toronto
- Virgin Festival, Toronto
- Wayhome Music & Arts Festival, Oro-Medonte
- WEMF (World Electronic Music Festival), South Algonquin

==== Prince Edward Island ====
- Cavendish Beach Music Festival, Cavendish

==== Quebec ====
- Eclipse Festival, Sainte-Thérèse-de-la-Gatineau
- Festival d'été de Québec, Quebec City
- Festivent de Lévis, Lévis
- FestiVoix de Trois-Rivières, Trois-Rivières
- Heavy Montréal, Montreal
- Igloofest, Gatineau
- Igloofest, Montreal
- ÎleSoniq Music Festival, Montreal
- Les Francos de Montréal, Montreal
- Longueuil International Percussion Festival, Longueuil
- M for Montreal, Montreal
- Montreal International Jazz Festival, Montreal
- Mundial, Montreal
- MUTEK, Montreal
- Osheaga Festival, Montreal
- Piknic Électronik, Montreal
- Pop Montreal, Montreal
- Riverside Festival, Gatineau
- Rockfest, Montebello
- Unity Electro Fest, Quebec City

== See also ==
- List of festivals in Canada
- List of music festivals in the United States
