= List of country music festivals =

The following is an incomplete list of country music festivals, which encapsulates music festivals focused on country music. This list may have some overlap with the larger topic list of folk festivals, and may also overlap with the related topics list of blues festivals, list of jam band music festivals, and list of bluegrass music festivals. Many of the festivals take place in North America.

Country music is a genre of American popular music that originated in Southern United States, in Atlanta, Georgia in the 1920s, and It takes its roots from the southeastern genre of American folk music and Western music. The origins of country music are the folk music of mostly white, working-class Americans, who blended popular songs, Irish and Celtic fiddle tunes, traditional ballads, and cowboy songs, and various musical traditions from European immigrant communities. Barn dancing and other folk dance styles would be featured at country music gatherings, and many modern festivals have continued to feature dance, rodeo, or other cultural aspects.

The term "country music" gained popularity in the 1940s in preference to the earlier term "hillbilly music". It came to encompass Western music, which evolved parallel to hillbilly music from similar roots, in the mid-20th century. "Country music" is used today to describe many styles and subgenres, and festivals may focus on Americana genres such as bluegrass, or newer genres such as country rock, country pop, or alternative country.

== Festivals ==
=== Oceania ===
Festival name	City/venue	Country	Remarks
Canberra Country Blues & Roots Festival	Canberra	Australia	
Gympie Muster	Gympie, Queensland	Australia	
Mildura Country Music Festival	Mildura, Victoria	Australia	
Tamworth Country Music Festival	Tamworth, New South Wales	Australia	January
Wandong Country Music Festival	Wandong, Victoria	Australia	

=== Europe ===
Festival name	City/venue	Country	Remarks
C2C: Country to Country	Dublin, London, Glasgow, Berlin, and Amsterdam	Ireland, England, Scotland, Germany and Netherlands	Annual
Harvest Country Music Festival	Westport House and Enniskillen/St Angelo Airport	Republic of Ireland, Northern Ireland	
Highways Festival	Royal Albert Hall, London	England	Annual - May
Piknik Country	Mrągowo, Poland	Poland	Annual - Last weekend in July

=== North America ===
Canada

- Atlin Arts & Music Festival
- Big Valley Jamboree (Alberta)
- Boots and Hearts Music Festival
- Cavendish Beach Music Festival
- CMT Music Fest
- Craven Country Jamboree
- CT Alberta (Country Thunder)
- Dauphin's Countryfest (Manitoba)
- Halifax Pop Explosion
- Havelock Country Jamboree
- Lucknow's Music In The Fields
- Sunfest

United States

- Bayou Country Superfest
- Carolina Country Music Fest, Myrtle Beach, South Carolina
- CMA Fest
- Country at the Heartland (Bonner Springs, Kansas)
- Country Jam USA
- Country Summer
- Country Thunder
- Country USA, Oshkosh
- CT Wisconsin (Twin Lakes)
- Faster Horses Festival
- Hardly Strictly Bluegrass
- Hodag Country Festival
- Hoofbeat
- Oregon Jamboree
- Route 91 Harvest
- Stagecoach Festival
- Tortuga Music Festival
- Watershed Music Festival
- WE Fest
- We're All for the Hall
- Winstock Country Music Festival

== Gallery ==
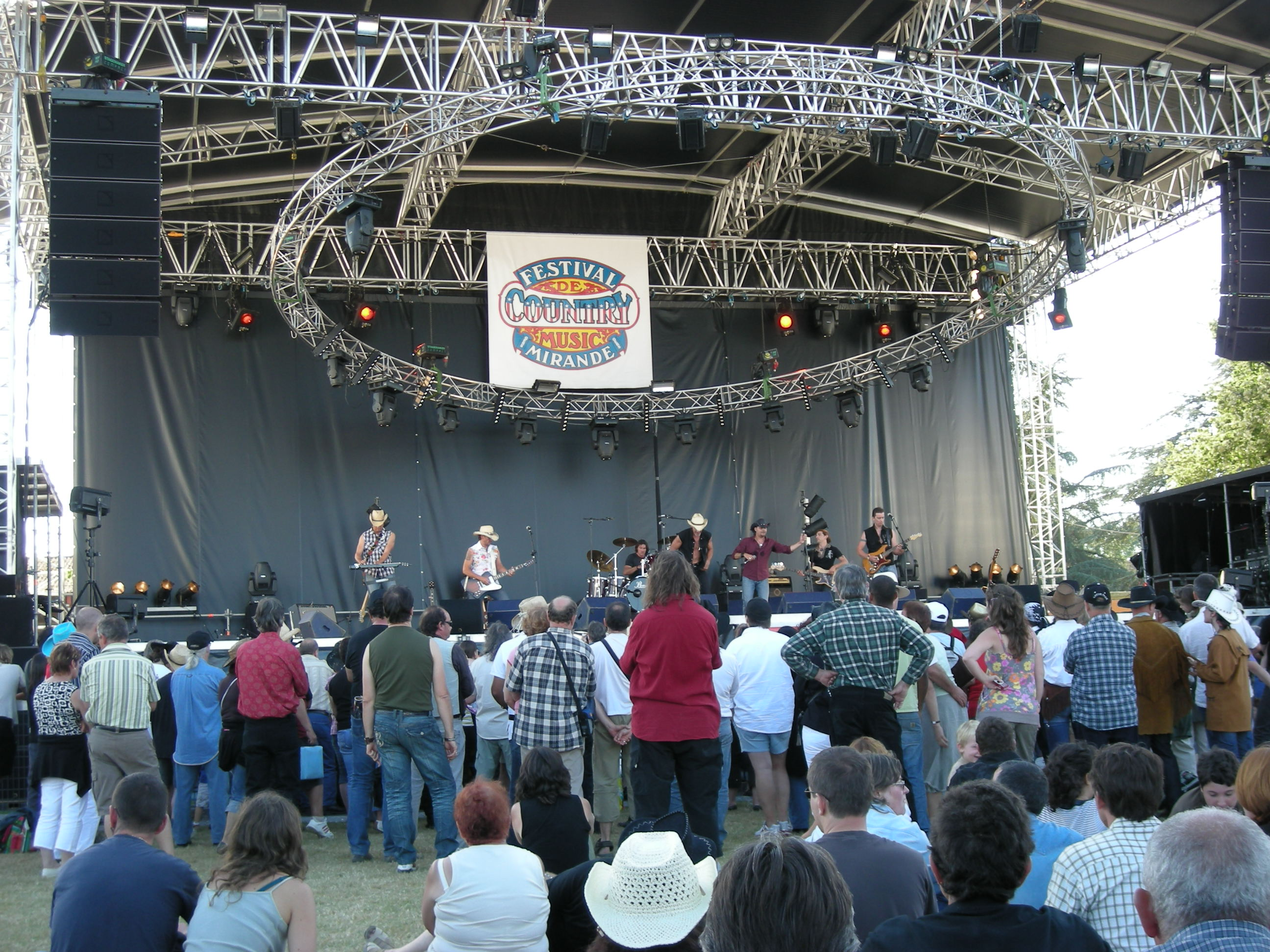

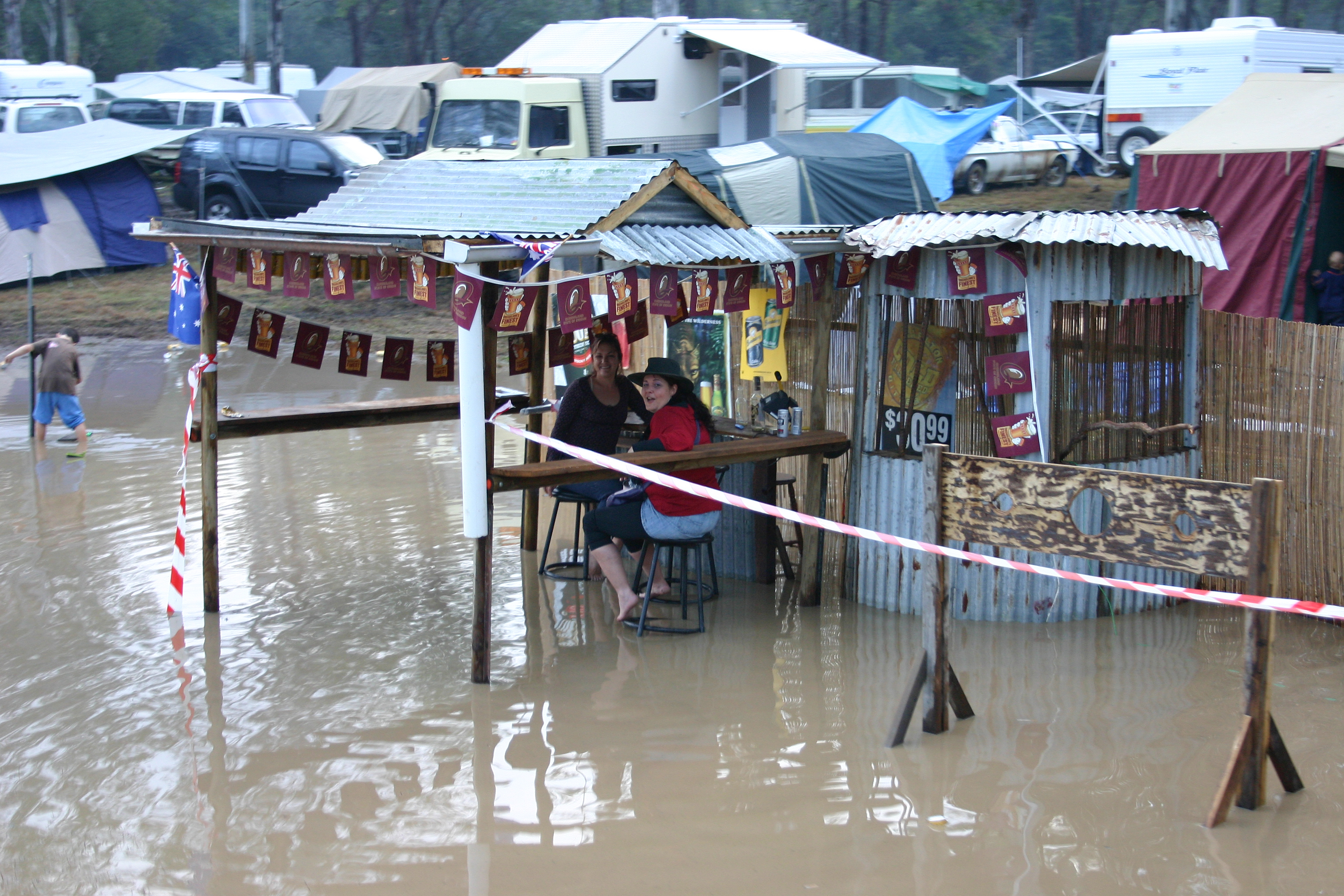
Gympie Muster in Australia

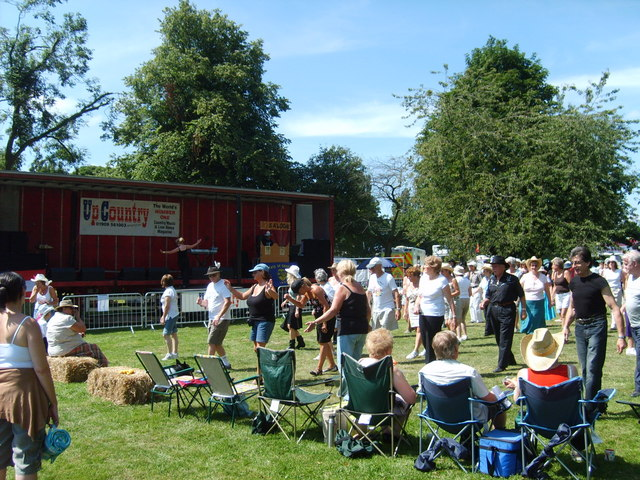
Wolvestock line dance

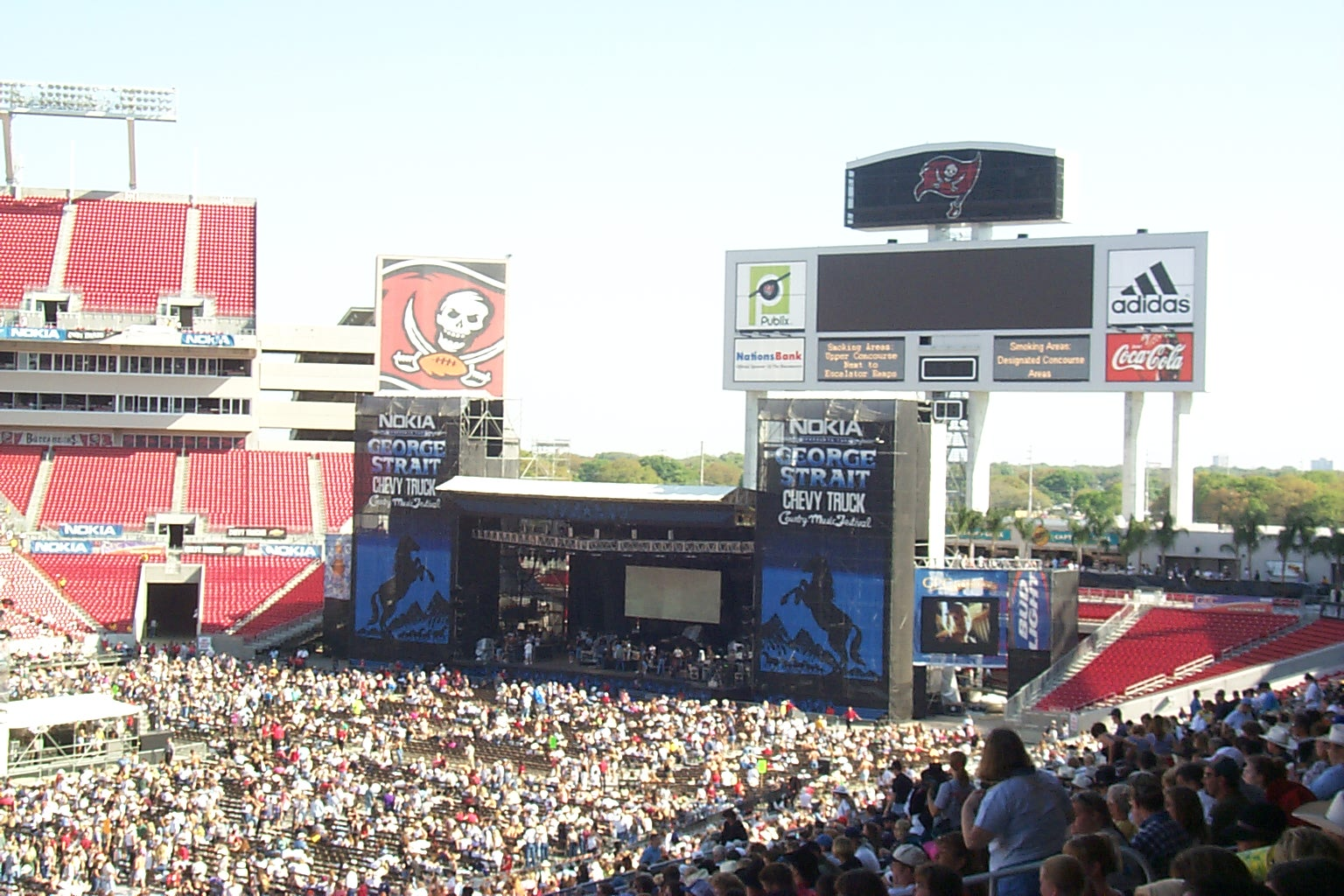
George Strait Country Music Festival in Tampa, Florida

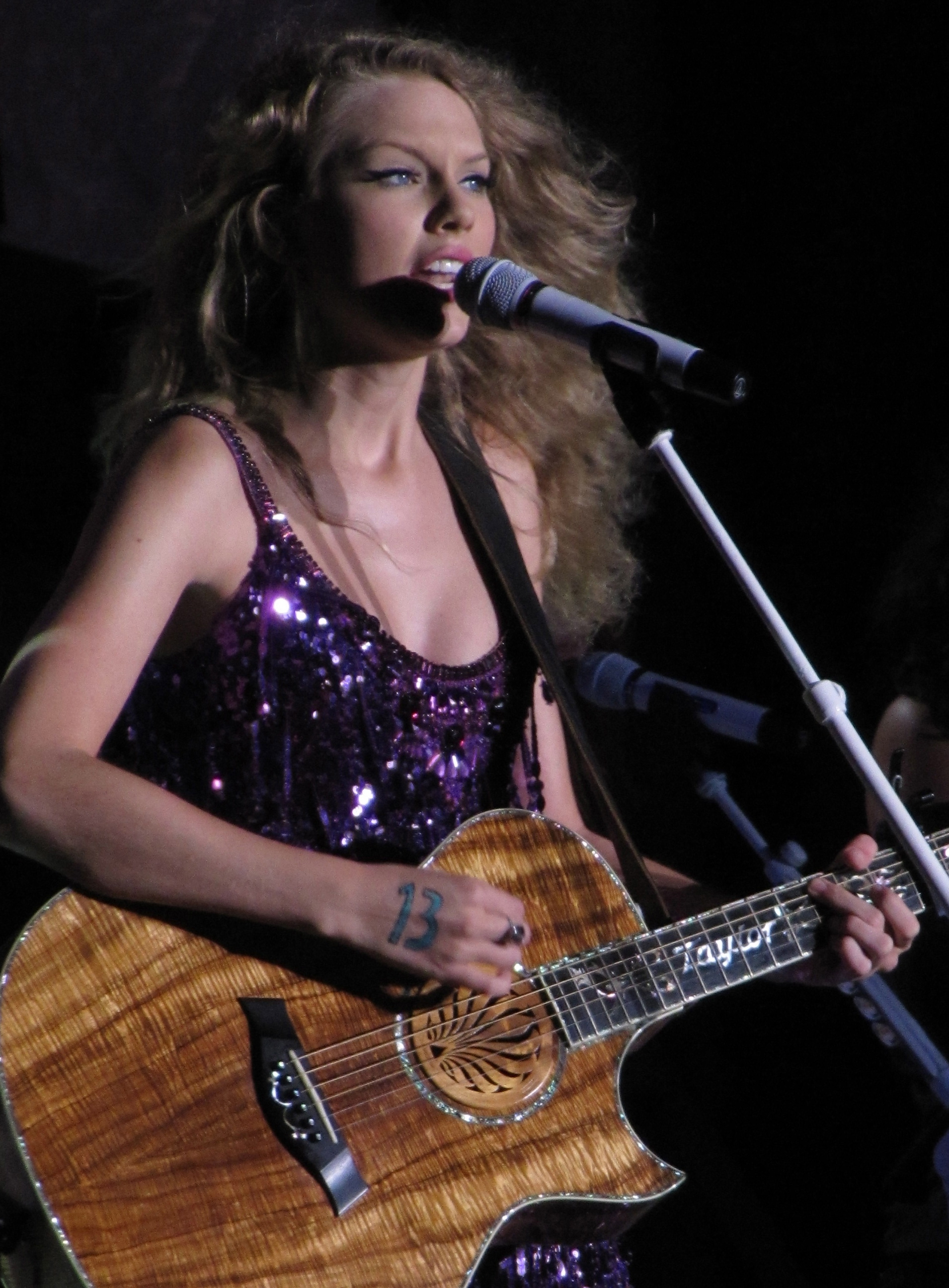
Taylor Swift at Cavendish

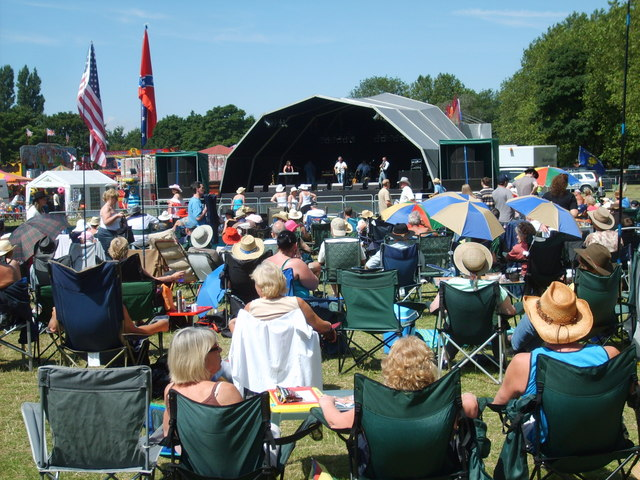
Wolvestock 14

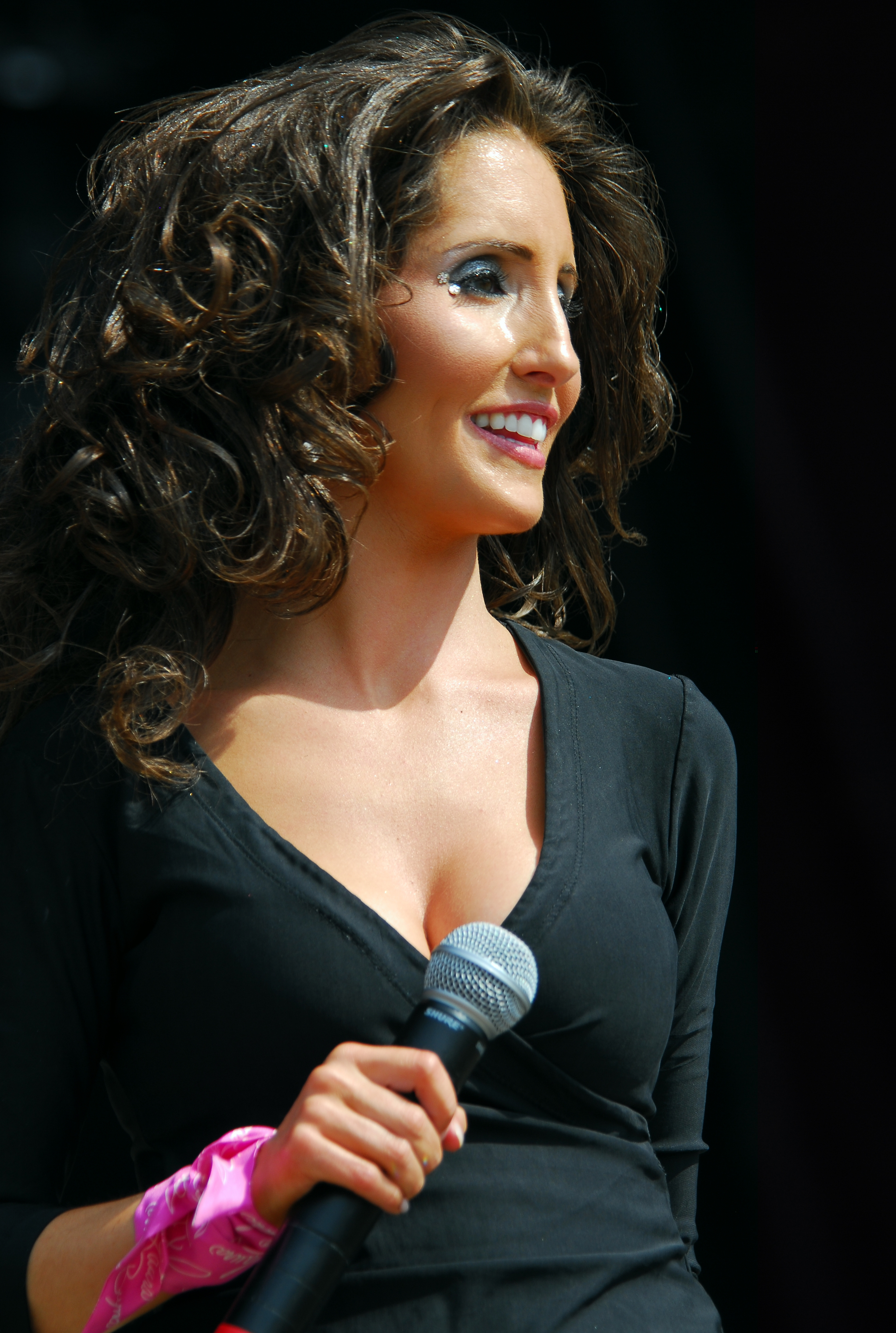

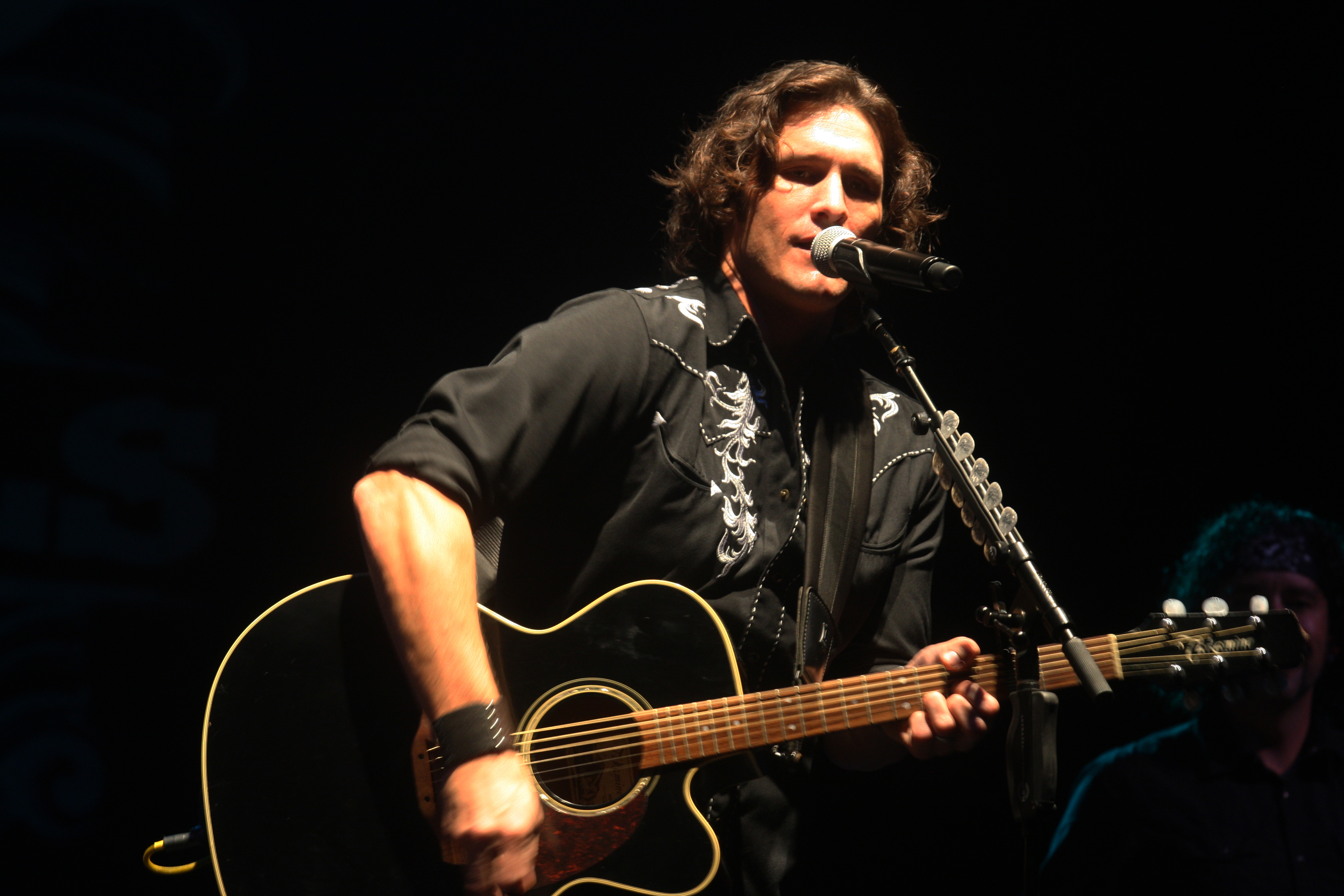

== See also ==
- Category:Country music festivals
- Category:Old-time music festivals
- Category:Rock festivals
- List of music festivals (Category)
- List of folk festivals (Category)
- List of blues festivals (Category)
- List of bluegrass music festivals (Category)
- List of jam band music festivals (Category)
