= Say G'day Rail Trail =

Rail trail in Victoria, Australia

The Say G'day Rail Trail is a "rail with trail" running between the neighbouring towns of Wandong and Heathcote Junction, 70 kilometres north of Melbourne, Australia. Suitable for pedestrians and cyclists, it was opened in December 2010. The trail was built with $247,750 allocated from the Victorian Bushfire Reconstruction and Recovery Authority.
