= Arthur Graham Brown =

- Born: 22 April 1919; Warminster, England
- Died: 3 January 1982 (aged 62); Heathcote Junction, Victoria
- Education: Christ's College, Cambridge
- Known for: President of Royal Australasian Ornithologists Union
- Scientific career
- Fields: medicine, ornithology

Arthur Graham Brown (22 April 1919 – 3 January 1982) was an Australian medical doctor and amateur ornithologist, notable for his involvement with the Royal Australasian Ornithologists Union.

== Early life ==
Brown was born on 22 April 1919 in Warminster, England, and emigrated to Australia that same year. He was educated at Glamorgan Preparatory School in Melbourne (1927–29) and Geelong Grammar School (1930–37). In 1938, Brown travelled by sea from Melbourne to England to attend university. (Note: Brown's journal from this journey was later edited by his son, Jonathan Brown, and published in the 2015 book From Colac to Cambridge: A 1938 Sea Journal.) Like his father and grandfather, he pursued a medical career, receiving his education at Christ's College, Cambridge (1938–40) and Middlesex Hospital in London, England (1940–45).

== Ornithology ==
Brown joined the Royal Australasian Ornithologists Union in 1936, and the British Ornithologists' Union in 1939. In 1956, he founded the Colac Field Naturalists' Club and was its first President. He joined the Royal Society of Victoria in 1959, and served on its council from 1970 to 1974. In 1968, he became an Honorary Associate in Ornithology at the National Museum of Victoria. He was involved in several extended ornithological field trips, including to north-west Australia in 1959, around the Australian continent in 1962, and to Australia's centre and north-west regions in 1967. He published the first Victorian record of the cattle egret (Ardeola ibis coromanda). Brown served as President of the Royal Australasian Ornithologists Union from 1969 to 1972, and presided over efforts to modernise the organisation.

== Personal life and death ==
Brown married Joan Frecheville in 1946, and together they had two sons and two daughters. Joan died in 1967 following a long illness. In 1968, he married Noela Downey. Brown died on 3 January 1982 at his home at Heathcote Junction, near Wandong, Victoria, and was survived by his second wife, Noela.
