= Piknik Country =

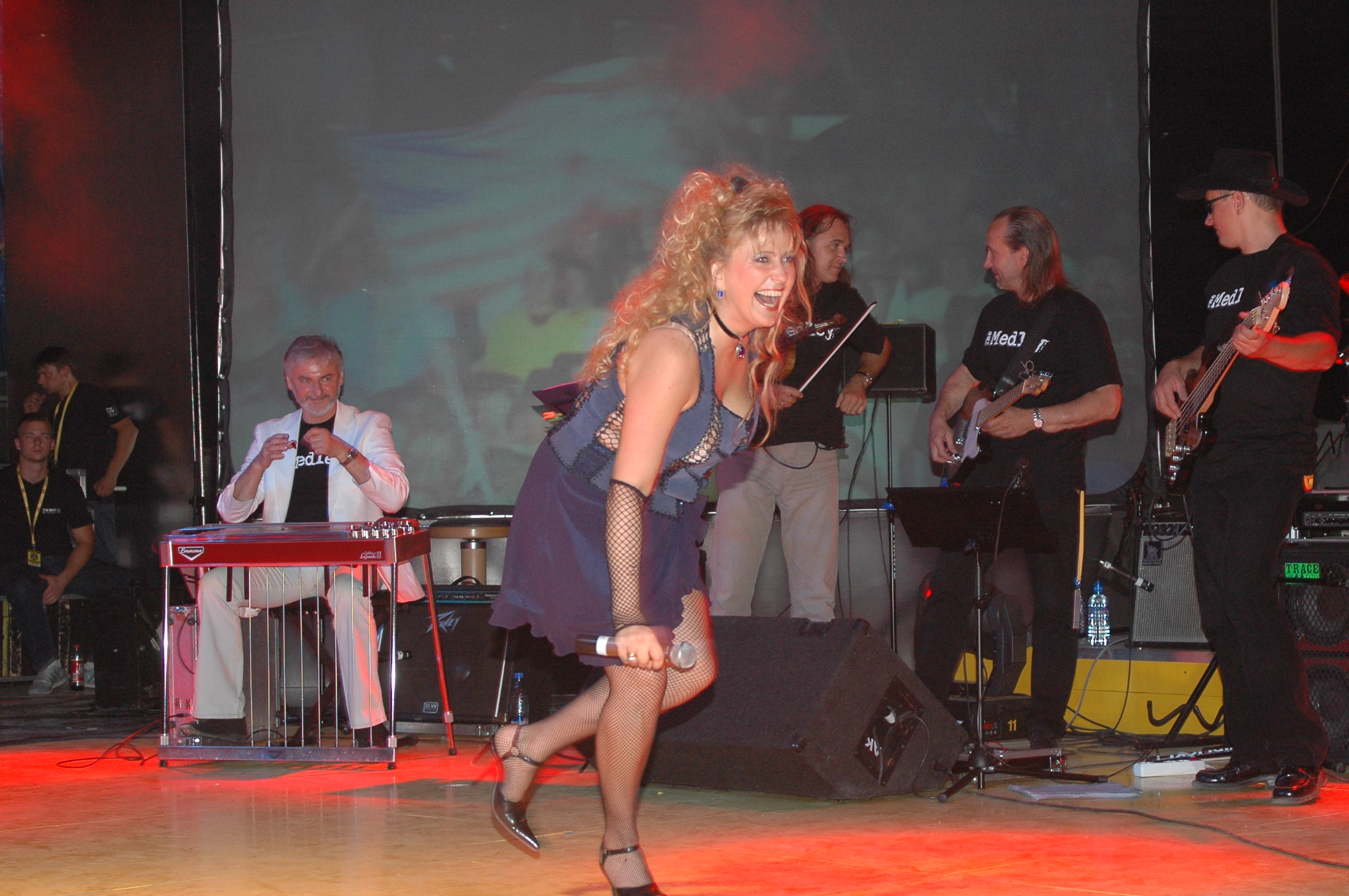
- Szymon Michta onstage at Piknik Country
- Genre: Country music
- Dates: last weekend of July
- Years active: 1983-present
- Website: Official website

Piknik Country is an international country music festival, held annually since 1983 in Mrągowo, Poland, on the last weekend of July. There are performances by both Polish and foreign artists. In 1989, it was the largest country festival in Eastern Europe.

Piknik Country is the oldest country music festival in Eastern Europe.

== See also ==
- List of country music festivals
- List of folk festivals
