= Country Thunder Saskatchewan =

Annual country music festival in Canada

Country Thunder Saskatchewan (formerly the Craven Country Jamboree) is an annual country music festival, held in the Qu'Appelle Valley, near Craven, Saskatchewan, Canada.

== History ==
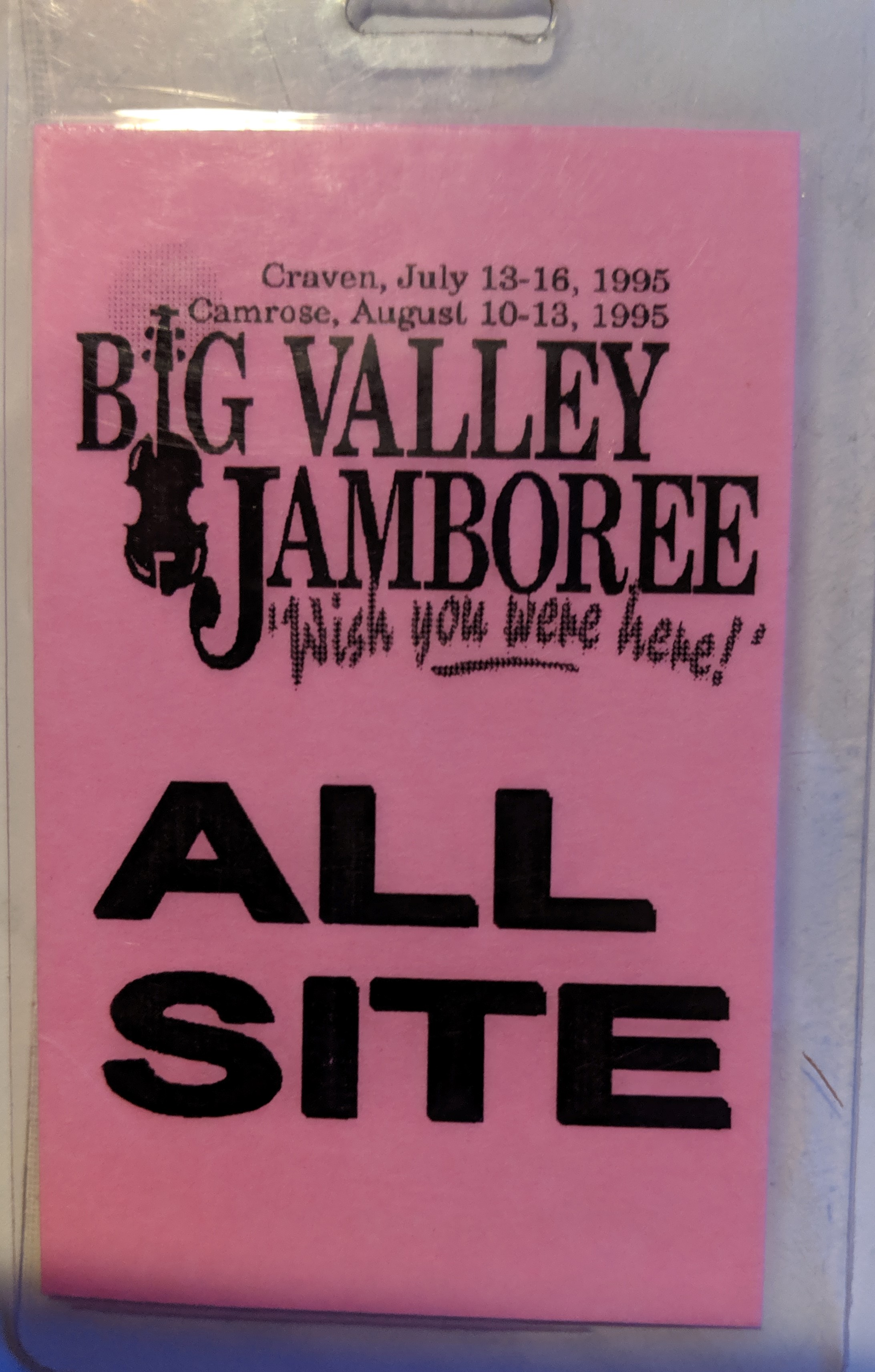
Backstage pass for the Craven and Camrose events.

The event was first held in 1983 as the Big Valley Jamboree, with Roy Orbison as a headline act. The event was originally founded by Roman Catholic priest Lucien Larré as a fundraiser for his youth housing charity Bosco Homes. A historic feature of the festival has been the "Gopher Run", a rush seating line where up to 3,000 spectators can bring their own chairs for the front row. In the late-1980's, the Jamboree came under government oversight due to an abuse scandal involving Larré. In 1993, the Jamboree was sold to the Alberta-based Vinco Foods, who began to hold a sister event in Camrose, Alberta. By then, the event had begun to see declines in ticket sales and revenue, leading to changes such as a cap on ticket sales, and replacement of the "Gopher Run" with reserved "VIP" seats in 1995.

Contrasting its earlier reputation as a family-oriented event, a more raucous atmosphere also began to develop, to the point that the Ministry of Health distributed free condoms at the Jamboree in 1993, a Regina-based company organized a strip show at the local curling rink in 1994, and an attendee in 1995 was quoted as saying that she was in search of "fast horses, faster men and more beer".

After going into receivership, the Big Valley Jamboree was sold to the Queen City Kinsmen in February 1996, who ran the festival with a "back to the basics" approach with less commercialization. Unable to return the event to profitability, the Kinsmen relaunched the Jamboree as a classic rock festival in 2000, known as Rock 'N The Valley. In 2005, promoter Troy Vollhoffer (who had previously worked as a stagehand for early editions of the event) took over the festival, and relaunched it with a return to country music as the Craven Country Jamboree. The Big Valley Jamboree in Camrose has continued to be held.

On October 27, 2016, it was announced that the event would become part of Vollhoffer's Country Thunder portfolio of festivals, with organizers stating that the integration gave it more "buying power" in terms of attracting larger acts.

In 2020 and 2021, the festival was cancelled due to the COVID-19 pandemic. The festival returned in 2022.
