= We're All for the Hall =

We're All for the Hall is an annual event that Keith Urban and Vince Gill put on in Nashville, TN. It is a country music concert series that brings in millions of dollars for the Country Music Hall of Fame and Museum.

== Dates ==
- October 13, 2009 Sommet Center, Nashville, Tennessee.
- October 5, 2010 Bridgestone Arena, Nashville, Tennessee.
- April 10, 2012 Bridgestone Arena, Nashville, Tennessee.

2012 Lineup included; Keith Urban, Vince Gill, Alabama, Merle Haggard, Don Williams, Thompson Square, The Band Perry, Lady Antebellum, The Oak Ridge Boys, Rascal Flatts, Little Big Town.

- April 16, 2013 Bridgestone Arena, Nashville, Tennessee.

The 2013 concert lineup included; Willie Nelson, Kris Kristofferson, Kid Rock, Jason Aldean and Eric Church

All For The Hall 2014 included the lineup of Urban, Gill, Brantley Gilbert, Brett Eldredge, Carrie Underwood, David Nail, Deana Carter, Kacey Musgraves, Kip Moore, Lee Ann Womack with Buddy Miller, Mary Chapin Carpenter, Reba McEntire and Ronnie Milsap .

== See also ==
- List of country music festivals
- Country music
