= Wandong Country Music Festival =

- Genre: Country
- Locations: Wandong, Victoria, Australia
- Years active: 1972–mid-1980s, 2001–2011

The Wandong Country Music Festival was an annual country music festival held in Wandong, Victoria, 55 kilometres (34 mi) north of the state capital, Melbourne. The earlier incarnation started in 1972, which was one of Australia's two largest country music festivals. In 1979 the festival's committee issued a 2× LP record by various artists, Wandong Country: the First Live Souvenir Recording of Australia's Top Country Artists, via the R.I.M.S. record label, Melbourne. Dwindling crowds in the early 1980s led to the festival's cessation.

In 2001, the 21st century version was inaugurated. The 2006 festival was held in early March at the LB Lavern Reserve in Dry Creek Crescent. As of 2012, the festival was no longer running, "due to circumstances beyond our control", according to the committee's website.

== See also ==
- List of country music festivals
- List of folk festivals
- Country music
