= Rock the Ocean's Tortuga Music Festival =

Annual music festival in Fort Lauderdale, Florida

Rock the Ocean’s Tortuga Music Festival
- Genre: Country, rock, roots
- Dates: April 14-16, 2023
- Locations: Fort Lauderdale, FL, United States
- Years active: 2013- current
- Founders: A.J. Niland / HUKA Entertainment, in collaboration with Chris Stacey’s Rock The Ocean Foundation
- Website: tortugamusicfestival.com

Rock the Ocean's Tortuga Music Festival is an annual music festival held at Fort Lauderdale Beach Park in Fort Lauderdale, Florida. The festival is usually scheduled for early April in Fort Lauderdale. Founded by A.J. Niland and Chris Stacey, the annual spring festival aimed to raise awareness and support for ocean conservation. A portion of the ticket proceeds goes to charity, and as of 2019 over $1,200,000 has been raised for ocean conservation.

The festival features multiple stages of live entertainment with a focus on country, rock and a variety of roots music. Past performers have included Zac Brown Band, Brett Eldredge, Eric Church, David Nail, Lynyrd Skynyrd and more. More Recent performers have included Eric Church, Shania Twain, and Kenny Chesney as headliners.

== Conservation Village ==
Each year, the festival features an area known as Conservation Village. The area holds interactive booths that contain games, exhibitions and displays with the focus of raising awareness of issues impacting the world's oceans and supporting marine research and conservation. The festival also aims to raise money to protect sea turtles that nest annually along South Florida's Atlantic seaboard. Past Conservation Village partners have included: Nova Southeastern University Oceanographic Center, Broward County Sea Turtle Conservation Program, The Nature Conservancy, University of Miami Marine Conservation Program and many others. At the Conservation Village, the Guy Harvey Ocean Foundation has also worked to raise ocean awareness with marine life artist and conversationalist, Guy Harvey. More than 30 organizations have been issued over 1 Million in funds by the Rock the Ocean Foundation.

== Festival Lineup By Year ==
2019

April 12-14

- Kenny Chesney
- Thomas Rhett
- Jason Aldean
- Sheryl Crow
- Flo Rida
- Maddie & Tae
- David Lee Murphy
- Trombone Shorty
- Kane Brown
- Carly Pearce
- Chris Janson
- Danielle Bradbery
- Dustin Lynch
- Michael Ray
2018

April 6-8

- Eric Church
- Lee Brice
- the Cadillac Three
- Lucie Silvas
- Keith Urban
- Kip Moore,
- Dan + Shay
- Dylan Scott
- Chase Rice
- William Michael Morgan
- Florida Georgia Line
- Russell Dickerson
2017

April 7-9

- Kenny Chesney
- Luke Bryan
- Chris Stapleton
- Alan Jackson
- Darius Rucker
- Brett Eldredge
- Dustin Lynch
- Slightly Stoopid
- Old Dominion
- Maren Morris
- Granger Smith
- Kane Brown
- Nelly
- Michael Ray
- LOCASH
- Daya
- G. Love & Special Sauce
- Drake White
- Brett Young
- Luke Combs
- Chris Lane
- RaeLynn
- Brooke Eden
- High Valley
- Steve Moakler
- Brandon Lay
- Russell Dickerson
- Ashley McBryde
- Jon Langston
- The Marcus King Band
- Quaker City Night Hawks
- DJ Rock
- DJ Bad Ash
2016

April 15-17

- Blake Shelton
- Tim McGraw
- Dierks Bentley
- Sam Hunt
- Thomas Rhett
- Billy Currington
- Kip Moore
- Lynyrd Skynyrd
- Michael Franti & Spearhead
- Randy Houser
- Joe Nichols
- Chris Janson
- A Thousand Horses
- JJ Grey & Mofro
- Elle King
- Bobby Bones & the Raging Idiots
- Chase Bryant
- Old Dominion
- The Cadillac Three
- Cam
- LANco
- Waterloo Revival
- Native Run
- Walker County
- Tucker Beathard
- Old Southern Moonshine Revival
- Ryan Hurd
- Courtney Cole
- Drew Baldridge
2015

April 11-12

- Kenny Chesney
- Zac Brown Band
- Jake Owen
- The Band Perry
- Little Big Town
- The Doobie Brothers
- Trace Adkins
- Sublime with Rome
- Josh Turner
- David Nail
- The Mavericks
- Colt Ford
- Chase Rice
- Sam Hunt
- Frankie Ballard
- Will Hoge
- Chase Bryant
- The Dirty Guv'nahs
- The Cadillac Three
- Old Dominion
- Maddie & Tae
- Nikki Lane
- Brooke Eden
- Dylan Scott
- Drake White and The Big Fire
- Judah & The Lion
2014

April 12-13

- Luke Bryan
- Eric Church
- Hank Williams, Jr.
- Train
- Dierks Bentley
- Brantley Gilbert
- Sheryl Crow
- Billy Currington
- Slightly Stoopid
- Ziggy Marley
- 38 Special
- Brett Eldredge
- Parmalee
- Cole Swindell
- Brett Dennen
- Delta Rae
- Eric Paslay
- Moon Taxi
- The Revivalists
- White Denim
- Frankie Ballard
- Chase Rice
- Brothers Osborne
- Blackjack Billy
- Sons of Fathers
- Quaker City Night Hawks
2013

April 13-14

- Kenny Chesney
- Eric Church
- The Avett Brothers
- Ben Harper & Charlie Musselwhite
- Jake Owen
- Lynyrd Skynyrd
- Eli Young Band
- Michael Franti & Spearhead
- Grace Potter
- Kip Moore
- Gloriana
- G. Love & Special Sauce
- Donavon Frankenreiter
- Mac Mcanally
- The Wailer
- Brett Eldredge
- Sister Hazel
- Dangermuffin
- Rayland Baxter
- The Bright Light Social Hour
- Old Man Luedecke

== COVID-19 ==
Due to the COVID-19 pandemic in 2020 the Tortuga Festival, originally scheduled for April 17, 18 and 19, 2020 was rescheduled to November 12, 13 and 14, 2021.

== See also ==
- List of country music festivals
- Country music
