= Cavendish Beach Music Festival =

Music event in Prince Edward Island, Canada

Coordinates: 46°29′0.6″N 63°23′24.76″W

- Genre: Country
- Dates: Annually in July
- Location: Cavendish, Prince Edward Island
- Years active: 2009–2019; 2022–present
- Website: Official Site

The Cavendish Beach Music Festival is an annual country music festival held each July in the resort community of Cavendish, Prince Edward Island, Canada, approximately 39 kilometres (24 miles) northwest of the provincial capital, Charlottetown. Produced by Whitecap Entertainment, the festival was established in 2009 and has since grown into one of Canada's leading music events. Attracting tens of thousands of attendees annually, the event regularly features top-tier international country artists, becoming a cornerstone in the local entertainment and economy.

== History ==
=== 2009 ===
In 2009, its inaugural year, the festival was a three-day event and featured major acts Rik Reese & Neon Highway, Tim McGraw, Big & Rich, and Reba McEntire. Additional acts included Paul Brandt, Doc Walker, and Deric Ruttan.

=== 2010s ===
==== 2010 ====
In 2010, the festival was extended to five days, and the site included the 2011 construction of a permanent stage and other supporting infrastructure. New to the festival for 2010 was a day featuring local artists in a partnership with the East Coast Music Association named "ECMA at the Beach". Major acts in 2010 included Rik Reese & Neon Highway, Keith Urban, Little Big Town, Taylor Swift, and Lady Antebellum. Additional acts included Emerson Drive, Gloriana, The Road Hammers, Shane Yellowbird, Dean Brody, Melanie Morgan, Gord Bamford, Tara Oram, Victoria Banks, and Ashley MacIsaac.

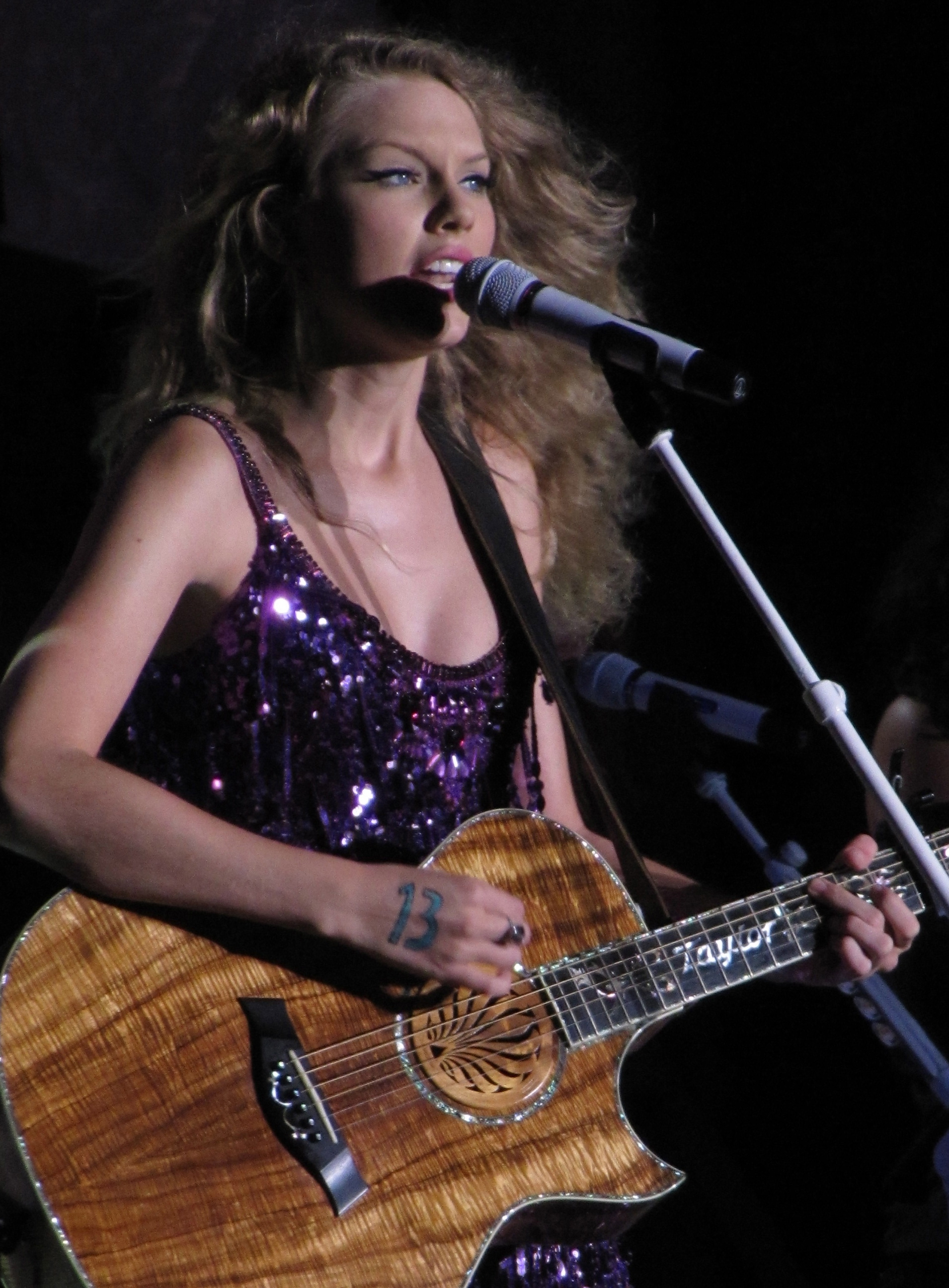
Taylor Swift performing on July 10, 2010, to a crowd of 35,000 people

Country music superstar Taylor Swift took the stage on July 10, the third day of the festival, where approximately 35,000 people were in attendance.

==== 2011 ====
In 2011, the festival was a four-day event with major acts Trace Adkins, Johnny Reid, Brad Paisley, and Toby Keith. Additional acts included Eric Church, George Canyon, Tanya Tucker, Aaron Lines, Chad Brownlee, Ricky Skaggs, Corb Lund, and Doc Walker.

==== 2012 ====
In 2012, the festival included major acts Dierks Bentley, Alabama, and Rascal Flatts.

==== 2013 ====
In 2013, the festival included major acts Dwight Yoakam, Kenny Chesney, Dixie Chicks. Additional acts included Little Big Town, Jason Blaine and Michelle Wright. The festival took place from July 5–7.

==== 2014 ====
The 2014 event took place from July 4–6, with a lineup of Lady Antebellum, Blake Shelton, Hunter Hayes, Darius Rucker, Gord Bamford, and Brett Kissel.

==== 2015 ====
For 2015, the event announced a headliners Eric Church, Keith Urban, Brantley Gilbert, Kira Isabella & The Mavericks taking place between July 10–12.

==== 2016 ====
The 2016 Cavendish Beach Music Festival featured The Band Perry, Blake Shelton, Kenny Chesney, Bobby Wills and Emerson Drive from July 8–10.

==== 2017 ====
The 2017 Cavendish Beach Music Festival was a three-day event, from July 7–9, whose lineup included Kip Moore, Zac Brown Band, Chad Brownlee, and Little Big Town.

==== 2018 ====
The 2018 Festival expanded to a four-day event from July 6–9, whose lineup included Luke Bryan, Shawn Mendes, Chris Young, and Brett Eldredge. This is the first time in six years that the festival has become a four-day event.

==== 2019 ====
The 2019 festival returned to a three-day format, whose lineup included Eric Church, Carrie Underwood, Cam, and Russell Dickerson from July 5–7.

=== 2020s ===
==== 2020 & 2021 Cancellations ====
The 2020 festival was scheduled to take place from July 10–12, with Miranda Lambert, Dan + Shay, Brett Young, and Dallas Smith set to headline. As a result of the COVID-19 pandemic, it was announced on April 28, 2020, that the festival was cancelled.

The 2021 festival was set to take place from July 9–11; however, it was announced on April 20, 2021, that the festival would not return that year due to the ongoing health crisis. On October 27, 2021, it was announced the festival would return the following year.

==== 2022 Return ====
After a two-year hiatus, the festival made its much-anticipated return from July 7–9, 2022. Headliners for the three-day festival included Luke Combs, Darius Rucker & Dustin Lynch.

==== 2023 ====
In 2023, the festival returned July 6–8 with headliners Kane Brown, Jake Owen, and Chris Stapleton.

==== 2024 ====
The 2024 festival featured Brothers Osborne, Tyler Childers, and Zac Brown Band as headliners from July 5–7.

==== 2025 ====
In 2025, the festival was held from July 10–12, with Shania Twain, Tyler Hubbard, and Lainey Wilson headlining.

==== Upcoming ====
The 2026 festival is scheduled to take place from July 9–11. On August 12, 2025, it was announced that Hardy, Cody Johnson and Tucker Wetmore will headline.

== Awards and nominations ==
Year	Awards	Award	Outcome
2010	Canadian Country Music Association	Festival, Fair, or Exhibition of the Year	Nominated
2011	East Coast Music Association	Event of the Year	Nominated
2014	West Jet Fun N' Festivals Series	Best Festival on Prince Edward Island	Won
2015	Canadian Country Music Awards	Festival, Fair, or Exhibition of the Year	Nominated
2015	East Coast Music Association	Event of the Year	Nominated
2016	Canadian Country Music Awards	Festival, Fair, or Exhibition of the Year	Nominated
2016	Tourism Industry Association PEI	Operator of the Year	Won
2017	Music PEI	Venue & Festival of the Year	Nominated
2017	Canadian Country Music Awards	Festival, Fair, or Exhibition of the Year	Nominated
2018	Canadian Country Music Awards	Festival, Fair, or Exhibition of the Year	Won
2019	Canadian Country Music Awards	Festival, Fair, or Exhibition of the Year	Won
2024	Canadian Live Music Industry Awards	Major Festival of the Year	Nominated

== See also ==
- List of country music festivals
- List of festivals in Prince Edward Island
- List of music festivals in Canada
