= World Electronic Music Festival =

Electronic music event held annually in Canada

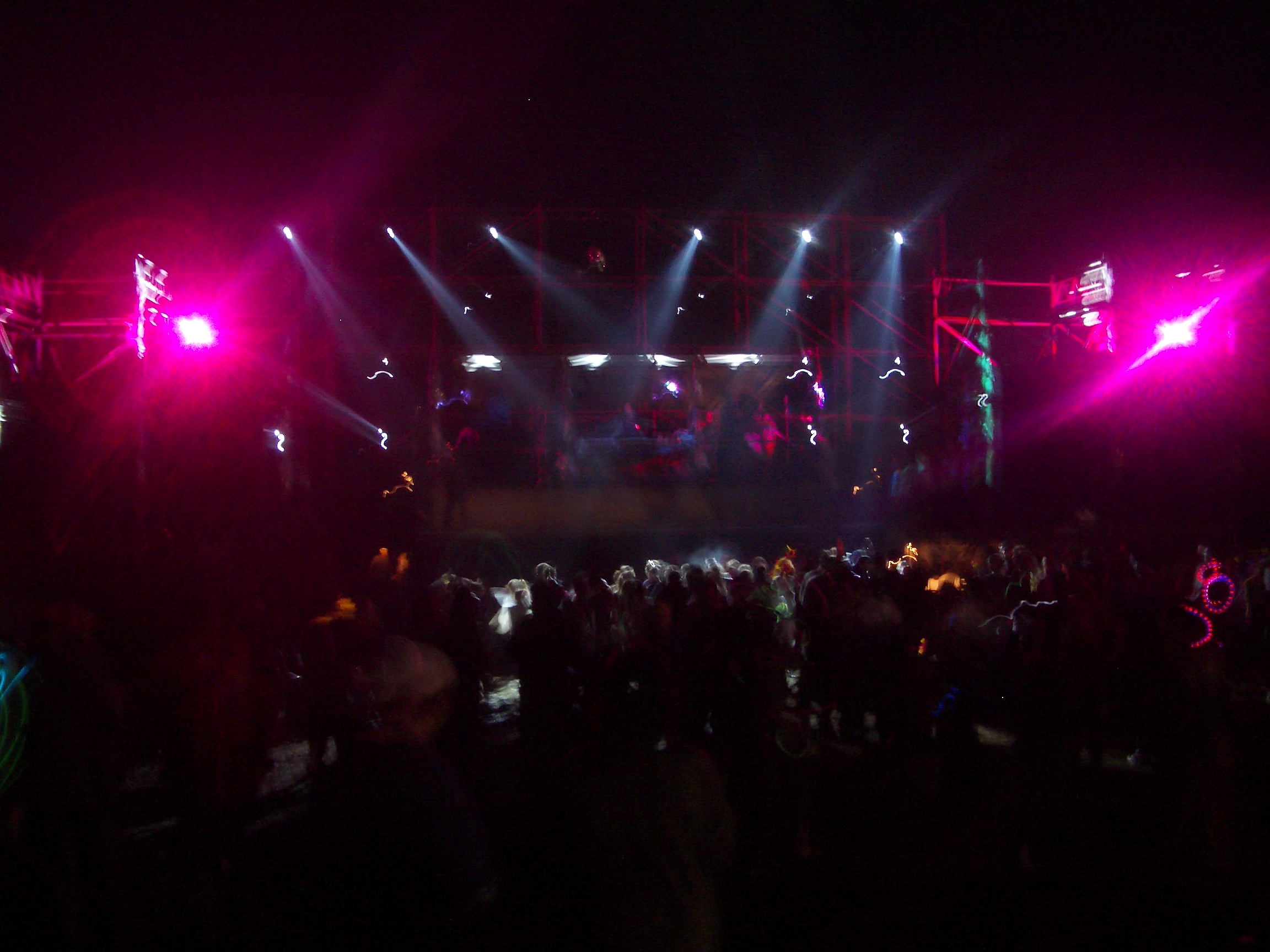
- Genre: Electronic music
- Dates: 1995–'08, 2011–'12
- Location: Northern Ontario
- Founders: Destiny Productions
- Capacity: 15,000
- Website: World Electronic Music Festival

The World Electronic Music Festival (WEMF) was an electronic music event held annually in various locations across Southern Ontario over a period of three days. It was created and run by Destiny Productions out of Toronto. In summer of 2008 Destiny put on what was said to be their last WEMF in Madawaska, however the event returned in 2011 for 2 more years.

== History ==
This festival was developed in 1995. At that time it was named "The World Trance Festival" which 2 years later was changed to The World Electronic Music Festival or WEMF. The festival ran from Friday through Sunday on an annual basis from 1995 to 2008 with attendance reaching 25,000 at its peak. With the popularity of dance music waning in the late 2000s, the festival took a 2-year hiatus in 2009 & 2010 to focus on CEMF but returned with a bang in 2011 and sold out its visually stunning but remote 5,000 person venue.

- WEMF (Destiny 10) 1995 took place at Mosport International Raceway in the center of the large race track from Friday, July 14 to Sunday July 16. A tornado ripped through the middle of it, destroying one of two sound stages and many people's tents went airborne. However, nobody was hurt and the festival continued the next day after repairs were made to the remaining stage. The first year featured John The Dentist, Evil Eddie Richards, Dr. Trance and many more.
- WEMF (Destiny 15) 1996 took place at a campground in Oro Medonte Township near Barrie, Ontario from Friday July 12 to Sunday July 14 and was a co-production with Toronto's Industry Nightclub.
- WEMF (Destiny 20) 1997 took place on private land just outside Orillia, Ontario
- WEMF (Destiny 25) 1998 took place at Christian Island near Midland, Ontario from Friday, July 17 to Sunday, July 19
- WEMF 1999 took place at White Sands, Sauble Beach near Owen Sound, Ontario from Friday, July 16 to Sunday, July 18
- WEMF 2000 took place at Dunnville Airport in Dunnville, Ontario from Friday, July 14 to Sunday July 16
- WEMF 2001 took place on private property in Bobcaygeon, Ontario from Friday, July 21 to Sunday, July 23
- WEMF 2002 took place on private property in Bobcaygeon, Ontario from Friday, August 2 to Sunday August 4
- WEMF 2003 took place at Trudeau Park in Tweed, Ontario from Friday, July 25 to Sunday, July 27
- WEMF 2004 took place at Wasaga Beach in Wasaga Beach, Ontario from Sunday, July 25 to Tuesday, July 27
- WEMF 2005 took place at the Orangeville Fairgrounds in Orangeville, Ontario from Friday July 8 to July 10.
- WEMF 2006 took place at Trudeau Park in Tweed, Ontario from Friday July 21 to Sunday July 23.
- WEMF 2007 took place at the Niagara Regional Exhibition (NRE) in Welland, Ontario from Friday July 20 to Sunday July 22.
- WEMF 2008 took place at Madawaska, Ontario, from Friday, July 18 to Sunday, July 20.
- WEMF 2011 took place at Madawaska, Ontario from Friday, August 12 to Sunday August 14. The lineup was announced in stages, with the portion first portion of the headliners released on April 15, 2011, and the second portion released on May 13, 2011. Highlights included Rusko, Skrillex, Zeds Dead, Pendulum, Andy C, Noisia, Calvin Harris, Infected Mushroom, Caspa, and Mark Breeze. Tickets were on sale beginning Tuesday, February 15, 2011, at 11 A.M. EST via www.wemf.com and were offered at escalating prices over time ($25 Increase per 1000 tickets). The talent lineup and budget was alleged to have been substantially increased for the 2011 festival to justify the substantially higher costs relative to previous years.
- WEMF 2012 was announced December 17, 2011 and returned to Madawaska, Ontario, from Friday August 17 to Sunday August 19. Headline artists at WEMF 2012 included Wolfgang Gartner, Zeds Dead, Moby, Chase & Status, Pendulum, Andy C, Infected Mushroom (live), DJ Hype, Thomas Gold, Datsik, The Crystal Method, Krafty Kuts, Dub FX, Felix Cartel, 12th Planet, Christopher Lawrence, John 00 Fleming, Trolley Snatcha, Harvard Bass, Adventure Club, Ed Rush & Optical, MC GQ, Figure, The Killabits, Torro Torro, Adam K, Jelo Bad Company Keys & Krates Mimosa, Two Fresh, Jeft Tale and many, many more over 3 stages. The production was their most ambitious yet, with 2 massive main stages and a 3rd tented area. Renegade, or Community stages are purchasable prior to the event by contacting WEMF through their website: www.wemf.com. WEMF was produced by festival founder, Destiny with help from Toronto's EMbrace Presents and the EDM division of Live Nation, Electronic Nation.
- Destiny, the founders of WEMF, became part of Toronto's Digital Dreams Music Festival in 2013 and continued to work on that festival for 3 more years

While there have been many rumours of a WEMF reunion of some kind, Destiny has stayed quiet on the subject while still throwing events in downtown Toronto to this day.

== Past Headliners ==
WEMF 1996 - The first festival was held in association with the UK's Outer Limits. Headliners included Paul Edge, Platipus Records, Colin Favor, Brenda Russell.

WEMF 1998 featured 6 main stages of music

- Destiny (trance): Jon The Dentist, Chris Liberator, M-Zone, Deniro, Mark EG, Christopher Lawrence, LL Bishop, Shane Morris, Matt Booker, Robert Oleysyk, Dave Trance, Mistress Barbara, The Alliance & Tweek (Live P.A.) + locals
- Next Junction (drum'n'bass): Nicky Blackmarket, L Double, D.Bo General, R Notorious J, The Substitution Crew: DJ Lorne / DJ Starchild / DJ Kpakpa, MC Flex / MC Mis-ty, Athena Produce, Adaire, MC Blaise + locals
- Hullabaloo (hardcore): Vinyltrixta, Spinback, Jimmy J + locals
- Return To The Source (psy trance): Medicine Drum, Cosmosis, Ceiba + locals
- Speed (techno): DJ Traxx, Dietrich, Altitude, Adam Marshall + locals
- AM Trip: Dreamstate (Live P.A.) + locals

WEMF 1999 featured 6 main stages of music:

- Destiny (trance): Jon The Dentist, Chris Liberator, Mark EG, Mark Tyler, Shane Morris, Commander Tom, Andy Trex, Christopher Lawrence, Scott Stubbs, Dave Trance, Xotec, Flex, Max Graham, Vapourspace + locals
- Dose (house + breaks): Dubtribe (Live), John Kelley, Daeman, Eric Davenport, Nigel Richards, Vitamin D, 3PO, Melting Man + locals
- Hullabaloo (hardcore + trance): Vinylgroover, Druid, M-Zone, Madam Zu, Mc Magika, Mc Stixman + locals
- Syrous/Renegades (drum'n'bass): Mickey Finn, Ray Keith, Brockie, MC Det, MC GQ + locals
- Moon Shadow Collective (psy trance): Psychopod, Frank E, Eon Ion, Tim Shuldt, Avatar + locals
- Speed (techno): Andrew Weatherfall, Silicon Valley, Daz Quayle, Mike Shannon, Vortex, Algorhythm + locals

WEMF 2000 featured 6 main stages of music:

- Trance: Paul Oakenfold, Hardware, Mark EG, John '00' Flemming, Chris Liberator, Christopher Lawrence, Commander Tom, BK, Andy Farley, Marco Dux Baby, Scott Stubbs + locals
- Drum'n'Bass: Darren Jay, Mickey Finn, Swift Skibadee, MC GQ + locals
- Hardcore: Sy, M-Zone, Orange Peel + locals
- House/Breaks: H Foundation, Problem Kids + locals
- Techno: Thomas Krome, Disco D, Joel Mull + many more headliners
- Psy Trance: Hallucinogen, Agent 1475 + locals

WEMF 2001 featured 8 main stages of music:

- Destiny trance stage: Nostrum, Commander Tom, Jon The Dentist, John '00' Flemming, Chris Liberator, Fergie, Andy Trex, Darren Pierce, Christopher Lawrence, Scott Stubbs, Benji Solice + locals
- Dose house/breaks stage: Bassbin Twins, H Foundation, Olav Basoski, Czech, 3PO, Chris Anderson + locals
- Syrous/Renegades drum'n'bass stage: Ed Rush, Optical, Ray Keith, Digital, Spirit, Dieselboy, Skibadee, MC MC, Rhyme Tyme, Rage + locals
- Hullabaloo hardcore stage: Scott Brown, Breeze, Devastate, Storm, MC Whizzkid + locals
- Eclipse psy-trance stage: Orion, Jean Borelli, Taka, Lori The HiFi Princess, Jamin + locals
- Flux booty/hard house stage: DJ Funk, 420, Bam Bam, Alex Peace, Josh Da Funky 1, Rip, Paradigm, Frankie Vega, The Zelch Brothers, Major Malfunction, Xotec + locals
- Techno stage: Punk Floyd, DDR, Christian Smith, Geezer, Murphy, Patrick DSP, Scorpion, Grooverobber + locals
- Neksis chill tent: Czech, Rob Theakston, William Van Loo, Echo + more

WEMF 2002 featured 6 main stages of music:

- Destiny trance stage: Christopher Lawrence, Graham Gold, Lange, Commander Tom, Chris Liberator, Yves Deruyter, Jon the Dentist, Lee Mullin of Hybrid, Pulser, Tim Lyall, Vinylgroover, Club Ra Tour featuring Scott Stubbs & Duane King + locals
- Afternoon performances live on the main stage: The New Deal, Liquidfied, The Aponauts, Hibernate, Prine nebula, Rhythm Mercenaries, West Magnetic, The Lou Cypher Project
- Syrous/Renegades drum'n'bass stage: Terry T, DJ Souljah, MC Fearless, Demolition Man, MC Dyer, Million Dollar Dan, Godfather JD, DJ Prophecy, Teebee, Shakka Zulu a.k.a. Golden Child + locals
- Dose/Backbreakers house/breaks/techno stage: DJ Hyper, Simply Jeff, Czech, Chris Anderson, Grooverobber + locals
- Hullabaloo hardcore stage: DJ Brisk, Kevin Energy, DJ Kaos, Simon Apex, MC Storm, MC Ethos + locals
- Eclipse/CIA goa-trance stage: Shakta (Live PA), Mindfield (Live PA), Shape Shifter (Live PA), Digitalis, John Phantasm, Matt Boom, Ben Mindfield, Hugh Sharpe, Jamin, Steve-o + locals
- Phlux urban beats stage: DJ Bam Bam, Alex Peace, DJ Assault, Josh "The Funky 1", DJ Rip, DJ Trajic, Jes One, Xotec + locals

== See also ==
- List of electronic music festivals
- List of music festivals in Canada
