= Troy Vollhoffer =

Canadian ice hockey player and entrepreneur (born 1966)

- Born: Troy Francis Vollhoffer; February 9, 1966 (age 60); Regina, Saskatchewan, Canada
- Occupation: Entrepreneur

Troy Vollhoffer (born February 9, 1966) is a Canadian-born entrepreneur living in Nashville, Tennessee.

== Hockey ==
He played hockey from 1982 to 1992 with minor, junior, and professional teams. According to The StarPhoenix, a Saskatoon-based newspaper, Vollhoffer signed a three-year deal with the Pittsburgh Penguins on October 6, 1986. He played for the New Westminster Bruins, Baltimore Skipjacks, the New Haven Nighthawks, the Muskegon Lumberjacks, the Flint Spirits, the Winston-Salem Thunderbirds, and the Nashville Knights. His junior career included the Regina Pats, the Winnipeg Warriors, and the Saskatoon Blades. Playing for the WHL's Saskatoon Blades, he was one of four 50 goal scorers during the 1985/1986 season.

== Premier Global Productions ==
Troy Vollhoffer is the owner of Premier Global Productions. Premier Global Productions is based in Nashville, TN, with a satellite office in Western Canada. They have been in operation for 30 years, providing lighting and staging equipment.

== Country Thunder Music Festivals ==
Vollhoffer is the Executive Producer of Country Thunder. Country Thunder is a music festival brand that hosts several concerts in North America each year. They have operated festivals in Wisconsin and Arizona since 2009, and shows in Saskatchewan since 2005 and in Alberta since 2016. Each festival offers entertainment on multiple stages. The main stage hosts the biggest acts, with new upcoming talent playing throughout the day. The side stage gives local artists the opportunity to perform.

== Nashville, Tennessee ==
Troy Vollhoffer is on the board of the Country Music Association, the Academy of Country Music and the T. J. Martell Foundation.

== Awards ==
Troy Vollhoffer was honored with the Academy of Country Music Lifting Lives Award and the Don Romeo Talent Buyer of the Year Award at the ACM Honors on Wednesday, August 23, 2023.

== Publications ==
Vollhoffer was a contributing guest writer for Sideshow World; his piece is called "When the Fair Arrived by Train."
