= CMT Music Fest =

Musical Festival

Coordinates: 43°28′21.38″N 80°26′59.67″W

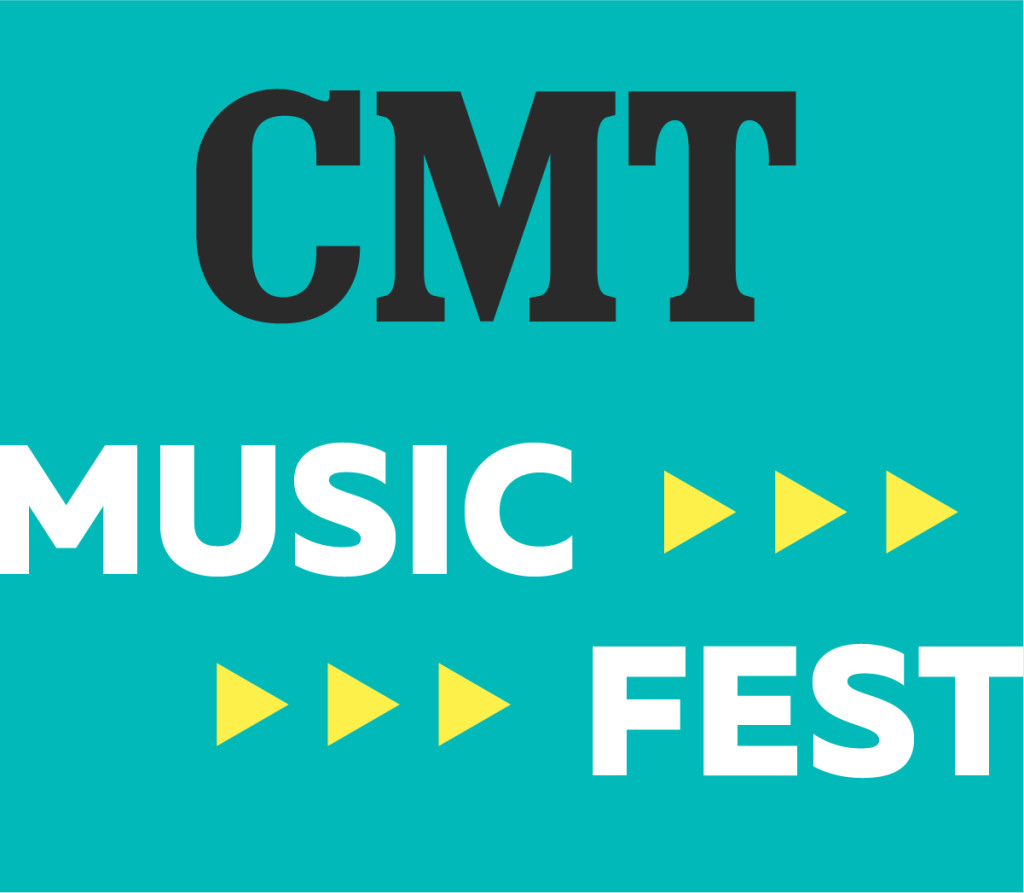
- Genre: Country
- Dates: July 8–9, 2016
- Locations: Bingemans; Kitchener, Ontario, Canada
- Years active: 2016
- Website: cmtmusicfest.com

CMT Music Fest was a two-day country music festival presented by Corus Live, a division of Corus Entertainment, which also owns the Canadian specialty channel CMT. The inaugural event was held on July 8–9, 2016 at Bingemans in Kitchener, Ontario, Canada.

== 2016 Line-up ==
=== July 8–9 ===
Headliners: Eric Church on July 8, Zac Brown Band on July 9.

The lineup also included The Road Hammers, Kira Isabella, Lindi Ortega, Cold Creek County and Leah Daniels.

The Washboard Union, Andrew Hyatt, Meghan Patrick and Kip Moore, were also scheduled to perform as well as Tom Cochrane with Red Rider, along with The Brothers Osborne and Drake White and the Big Fire.

== See also ==
- Music festival
- List of festivals in Canada
- List of festivals in Ontario
- List of country music festivals
