= Igloofest =

Annual music festival in Montreal

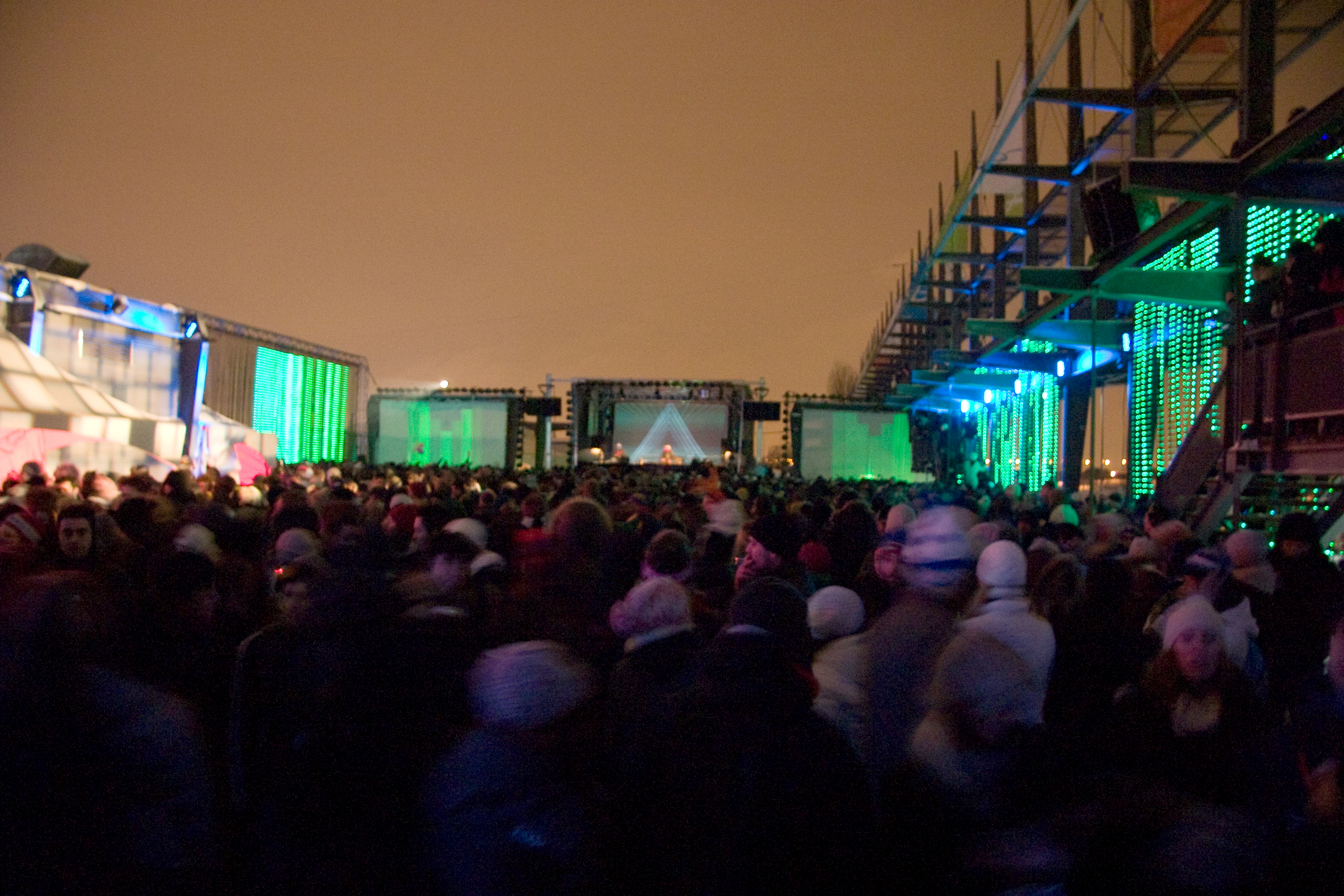
- Igloofest in January, 2009
- Genre: Electronic music
- Dates: 2007-present
- Locations: Old Port of Montreal in Montreal, Quebec, Canada
- Website: Official website

Igloofest is an annual outdoor music festival which takes place at the Old Port of Montreal in Montreal, Quebec, Canada. Co-produced by Piknic Electronik and the Quays of the Old Port, it began on January 19, 2007 and now draws crowds in the tens of thousands every year.

== "One-Piece" Contest ==
Every weekend, a contest takes place in which the contestants show off their one-piece suits. The pictures are then posted on the official Igloofest website. The prize bundle can include anything from expensive winter clothing to rare V.I.P. tickets.

== Notable Performances ==
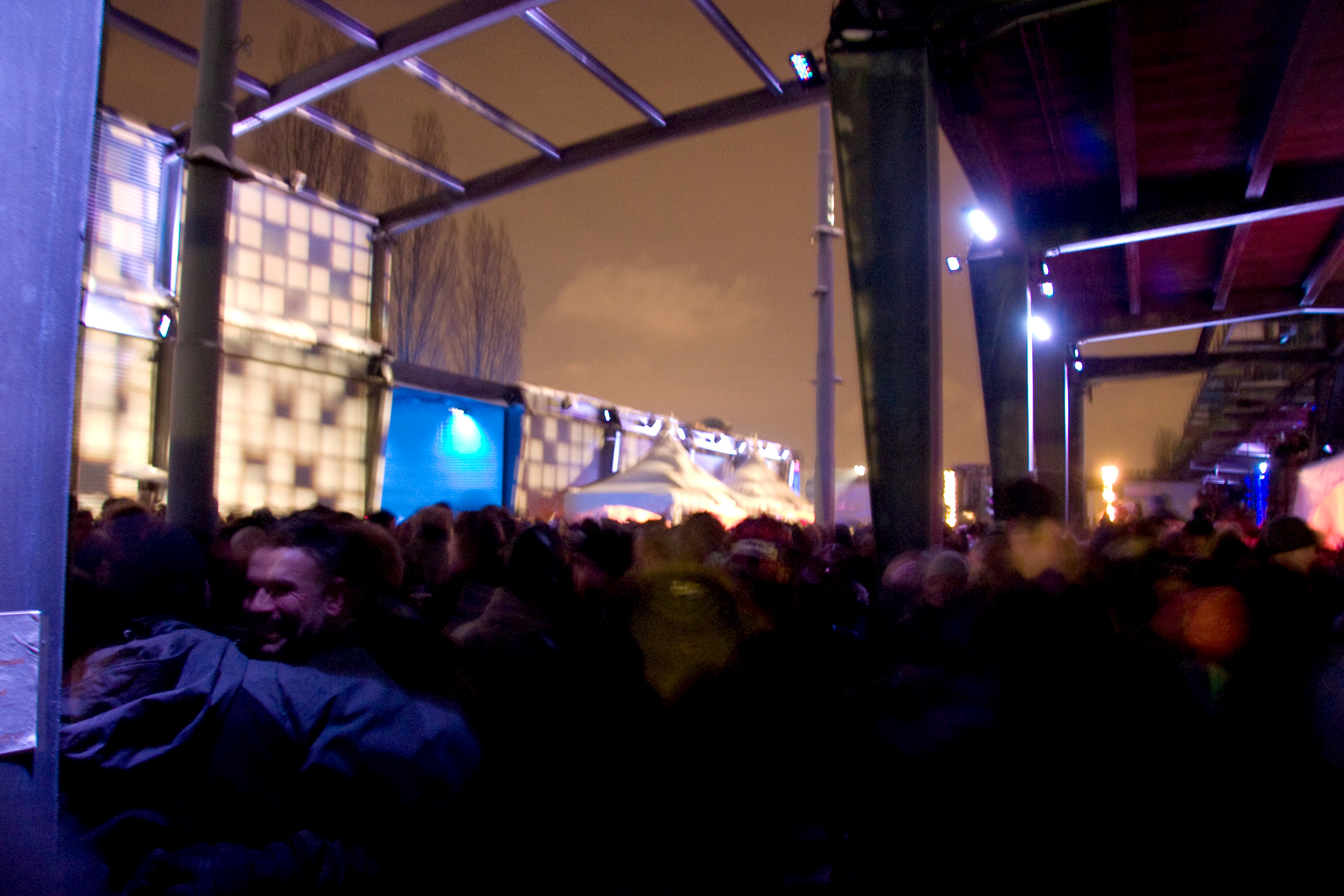
Igloofest in January, 2009

- Ghislain Poirier (2007, 2008)
- Josh Wink (2008)
- Misstress Barbara (2008)
- Thomas Schumacher (2008)
- Lee Burridge (2009)
- Drop The Lime (2009)
- James Holden (2009)
- Modeselektor (2009)
- Adam Freeland (2009)
- Evil Nine (2009)
- Jesse Rose (2010)
- Adultnapper (2010)
- Mark Farina (2010)
- Renaissance Man (2010)
- Guy Gerber (2010)
- M.A.N.D.Y. (2010)
- Rusko (2010)
- Joris Voorn (2010)
- Nic Fanciulli (2010)
- Green Velvet (2012, 2017)
- Tiga (2012)
- Diplo (2012, 2019)
- A-Trak (2012)
- Carl Cox (2017)
- Gramatik (2019)
- Rüfüs Du Sol (2020)
- Nina Kraviz (2020)
- Kaytranada (2020)

== See also ==
- List of electronic music festivals
