= Paradise Music Festival =

Music festival in Australia

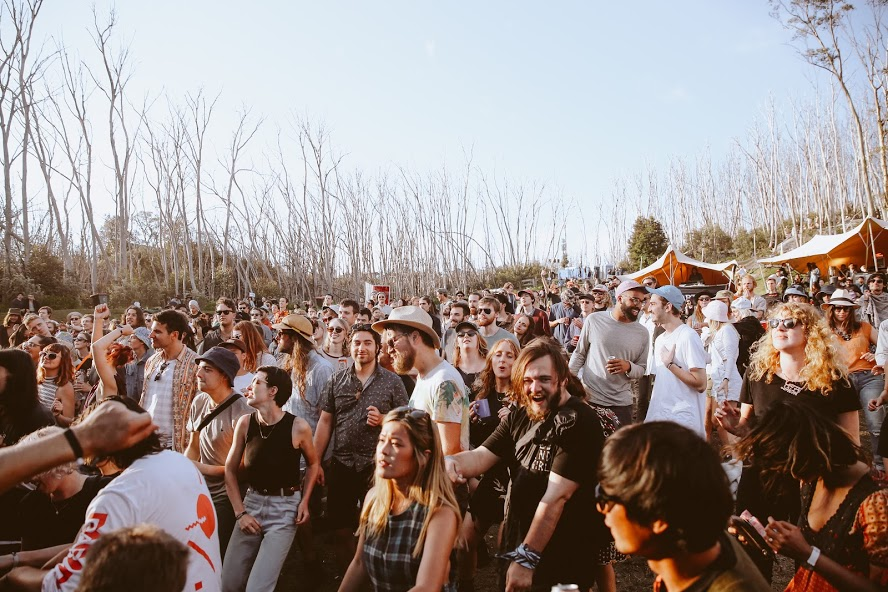
- Genre: Various
- Dates: Late November
- Locations: Lake Mountain, Victoria Australia
- Years active: 2013–19, 2021–

Paradise Music Festival (or simply known as Paradise) is an annual three day camping music festival held in the last weekend of November at Lake Mountain Alpine Resort, located in Victoria, Australia approximately 120 kilometres from Melbourne. The festival was first held in 2013 and has been operating for 13 years.

No festival was held in 2020.

== Description ==
Paradise is characterised as a boutique festival. Capped at 2000 attendees, the event hosts a large number of Australian artists that span from various genres, including many unsigned artists. The event also displays a range of artworks and installation art from emerging visual artists.

The festival site overlooks Great Dividing Range and Alpine National Park. In previous years, the layout of the festival has involved two areas, an outdoor amphitheatre, "Stage Paradise" and "Clubland," a venue designed for night-time performances.

== Artist lineups by year ==
=== 2013 ===
- Glass Towers
- Elizabeth Rose
- Millions
- Oisima
- Naysayer & Gilsun (DJ Set)
- Client Liaison
- Forces
- friendships
- Albert Salt
- Alta
- Animaux
- B.O.O.M.A
- Dark Arts Darts
- David
- Deer
- Deja
- Donny Benet
- Electric Sea Spider
- Glass Mirrors
- Godwolf
- Hollow Everdaze
- House of Laurence
- Hug Therapist
- I’ll’s
- Kate Martin
- Leaks
- LUCIANBLOMKAMP
- Michael Ozone
- Mu-Gen
- Namine
- NO ZU
- OSKR
- Planete
- Post Percy
- SILETJAY
- SOCCER LEGENDS
- Squarehead
- The Demon Parade
- The McQueens
- The Red Lights
- The Supporters
- Them Swoops
- Wafia

=== 2014 ===
- Kirin J. Callinan
- Oscar Key Sung
- Crooked Colours
- Young Franco
- Drunk Mums
- Rat & Co
- UV boi
- Silent Jay
- LUCIANBLOMKAMP
- The Sinking Teeth
- Banoffee
- Kllo
- friendships
- JPS
- I’lls
- Kirkis
- Apart From This
- Otologic
- Tranter
- Deer
- Total Giovanni
- Planete
- Ecs
- Lanks
- Darcy Baylis
- Air Max 97
- CC: DISCO!
- Rara
- Hubert Clarke Jr
- Foreign/National
- Jahnne
- Null
- Urban Problems
- Harold
- Femi

=== 2015 ===
- Roland Tings
- My Disco
- Lurch & Chief
- Black Cab
- Black Vanilla
- Tired Lion
- Kirkis
- Cassius Select
- The Harpoons
- Flyying Colours
- SMILE
- Dorsal Fins
- friendships
- Darts
- Totally Mild
- Catlips
- Oslow
- Jaala
- Null
- Habits
- The Infants
- Strict Face
- Leisure Suite
- DEER
- Cale Sexton
- Alta
- Tiny Little Houses
- Broadway Sounds
- Andrei Eremin
- 0.1
- Marcus Whale
- Amateur Dance
- Neighbourhood Youth
- Good Morning
- ASDASFR BAWD
- Post Percy
- Misty Nights
- Nutrition
- The Completely Biys
- IO
- Thomas Touche

=== 2016 ===
- Gold Class
- Harvey Sutherland & Bermuda
- Baro
- Pearls
- GL
- LUCIANBLOMKAMP
- Sui Zhen
- Gabriella Cohen
- Fortunes
- Julia Jacklin
- Lossless
- BUOY
- Krakatau
- Alice Ivy
- SAATSUMA
- Corin
- Simona Castricum
- Christopher Port
- Nali
- Huntly
- Kangaroo Skull
- OCDANTAR
- Couture
- SHOUSE
- Dannika
- River Yarra
- Tom Baker
- Jalé
- DJ Kiti
- Mu-Gen
- Paradise DJs
