= Heathcote Junction =

- Town
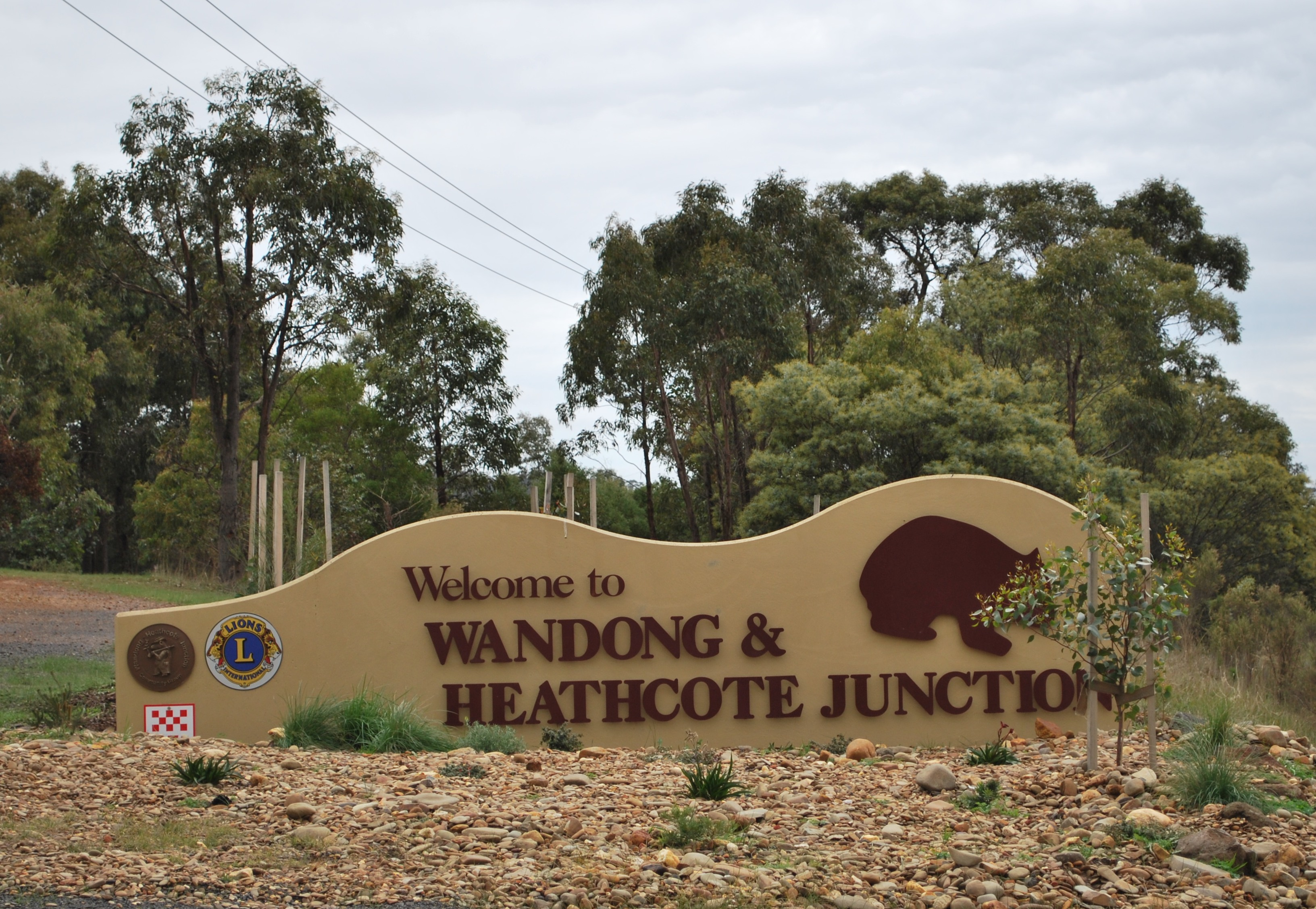
- Entry sign

- Coordinates: 37°22′0″S 145°01′0″E
- Country: Australia
- State: Victoria
- Region: Hume
- LGA: Shire of Mitchell
- Location: 53 km (33 mi) N of Melbourne; 15 km (9.3 mi) SE of Kilmore, Victoria; 2 km (1.2 mi) S of Wandong

Government
  - State electorate: Euroa
  - Federal division: McEwen

Population
  - Total: 811 (2021 census)
- Postcode: 3758

Heathcote Junction is a town in Victoria, Australia. The town is located 53 kilometres (33 mi) north of the state capital, Melbourne and 3 kilometres (1.9 mi) from nearby Wandong. At the 2021 census, Heathcote Junction had a combined population of 839.

The town was affected by the Black Saturday bushfires, including one fatality.

== See also ==
- Heathcote Junction railway station
