= Wandong =

- Town
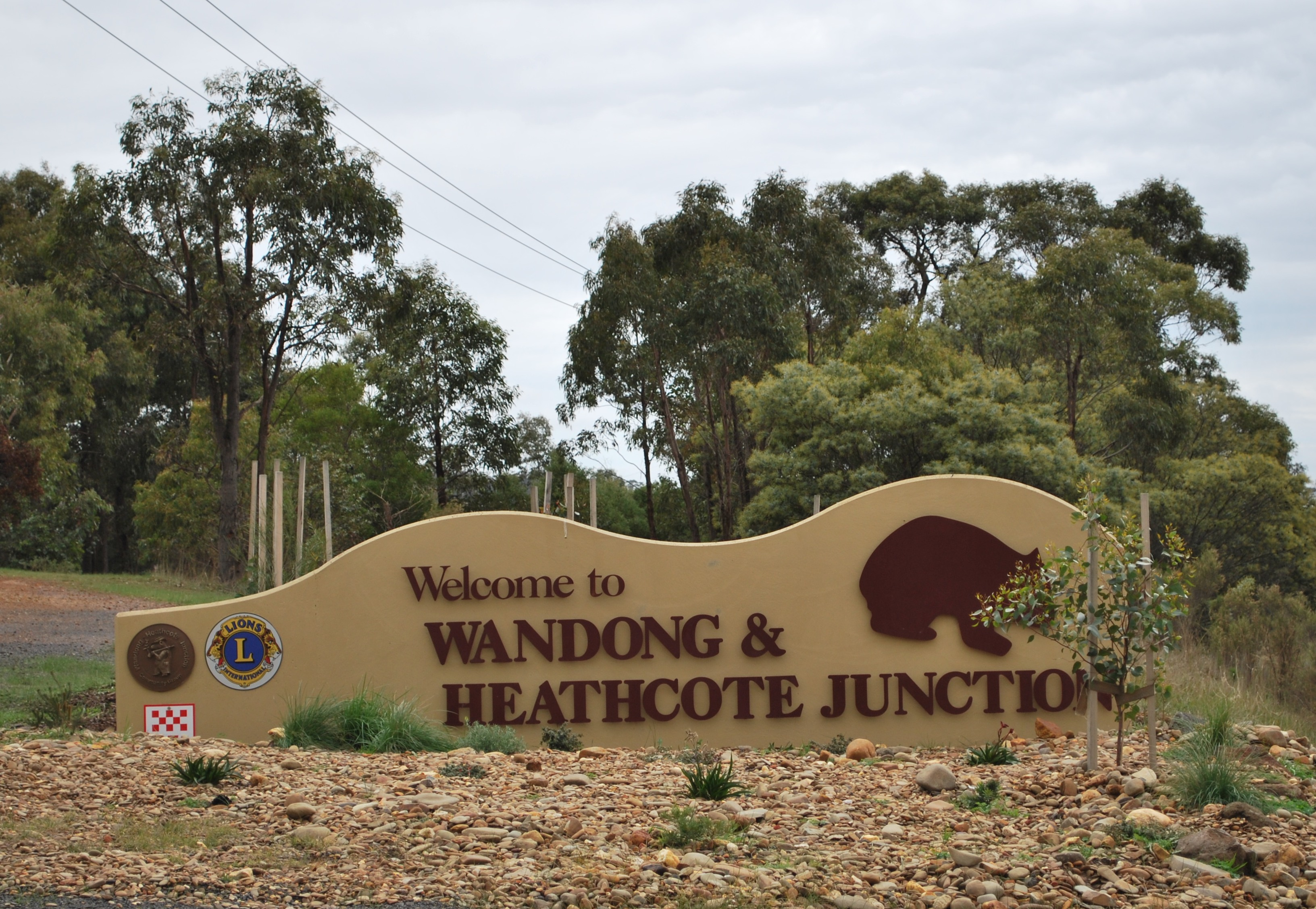
- Entry sign

- Interactive map of Wandong
- Coordinates: 37°21′S 145°01′E
- Country: Australia
- State: Victoria
- Region: Hume
- LGA: Shire of Mitchell
- Location: 55 km (34 mi) N of Melbourne; 11 km (6.8 mi) SE of Kilmore; 4 km (2.5 mi) N of Heathcote Junction

Government
  - State electorate: Euroa and Yan Yean
  - Federal division: McEwen
- Elevation: 307 m (1,007 ft)

Population
  - Total: 1,340 (2016 census)
- Postcode: 3758
Localities around Wandong
Kilmore	Broadford	Waterford Park
Wallan	Wandong	Clonbinane
Wallan	Heathcote Junction	Upper Plenty

Wandong /ˈwɒndɒŋ/ is a town in Victoria, Australia. The town is about 50 kilometres (30 mi) north of the state capital, Melbourne, on the Hume Highway. It adjoins the town of Heathcote Junction, and at the 2016 census, the two towns had a population of 1,340. The main centre nearest Wandong is Kilmore.

== History ==
The traditional owners of Wandong are the Taungurung people, a part of the Kulin nation that inhabited a large portion of central Victoria including Port Phillip Bay and its surrounds. Wandong itself is an Aboriginal word meaning "Spirit".

The first Europeans to reach Wandong were Hamilton Hume and Captain William Hilton Hovell who travelled through the centre of the future town of Wandong on 13 December 1824. The explorers proceeded 1,260 metres South of Arkell’s Lane, Wandong and crossed the Dividing Range at the low peak there that they named Hume’s Pass. They then moved South along Eastern Ridge, Hidden Valley, and downhill to the Merri Creek, Wallan East near Kelby Lane.

That made Wandong the second township site in Victorian history to be traversed by European explorers. Broadford was the first: Hume and Hovell had passed through it on the same morning.

This exact route has been proven by decoding the map drawn by Hamilton Hume which conforms exactly to the original journal of William Hovell. Hamilton Hume in 1867 corrected his own earlier error that the party crossed the Dividing Range at Big Hill, Bylands.

Wandong was a pastoral region from at least 1843.

By 1876 a small settlement had arisen and a post office gazetted to Mr. F. G. Arkell.

From 1880 Wandong became a major sawmilling and processing town and region.

The town is now a major transport hub with the Hume Highway and the Albury-Wodonga and Shepparton railway lines passing through it. It has its own railway station.

The local school was originally situated to the south of Wandong/Heathcote Junction and was known as Lightwood Flat Common School when it opened in 1871. The school was transferred to its current site in Wandong in 1882, and is currently known as Wandong Primary School. The school was damaged slightly in the Black Saturday bushfires.

The town hosts the Wandong Country Music Festival.

== Ghost sightings & local folklore ==
The area has been known for sometime as being a local ghost haunt. Locals & supernatural enthusiasts have often travelled to the region in search of the ghost of Richard Hard who was a prospector during the Victorian Goldrush and local resident and famously disappeared after working the Golden Dyke mine in Clonbinane.
