= Country Thunder =

Series of country music festivals

Country Thunder Music Festivals Country Thunder Rockin' Thunder
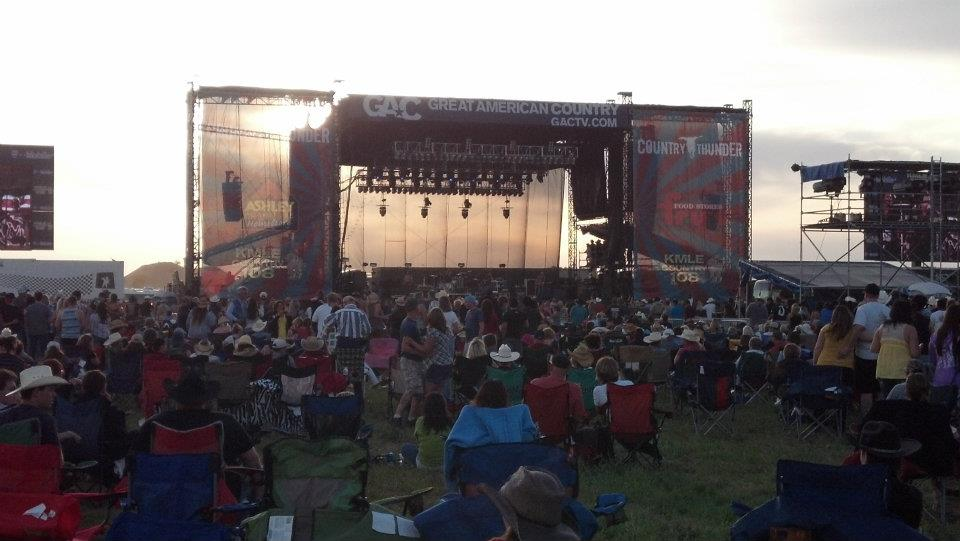
- Country Thunder Florence, Arizona
- Genre: Country music (Country Thunder); Rock music (Rockin' Thunder)
- Location: Various North American locations
- Website: www.countrythunder.com www.rockinthunderfest.com

Country Thunder Music Festivals is a music festival company that hosts several concerts in North America each year branded either as Country Thunder (country music) or Rockin' Thunder (rock music). They have operated festivals in Arizona since 1993, in Wisconsin since 1996, in Saskatchewan since 2005, in Alberta since 2016, in Florida since 2019, and in Manitoba in 2025. Each festival offers entertainment on multiple stages. The main stage hosts national acts, with talent playing throughout the day. The side stage gives local artists opportunities to perform.

== Florence, Arizona ==
Country Thunder Arizona is held on the Canyon Moon Ranch (now AZ Talio Ranch) in Florence, Arizona. The festival runs Thursday through Sunday, typically during the first week of April. Fans can purchase a single day pass or a weekend pass that allows them access to the festival for the entire weekend. The festival also offers reserved seating.

Headliners in previous years have included Morgan Wallen, Eric Church, Chris Young, Dierks Bentley, Blake Shelton, Thomas Rhett, Jason Aldean, Luke Bryan, Toby Keith, and Cole Swindell.

== Twin Lakes, Wisconsin ==
Country Thunder Wisconsin is held in Twin Lakes, Wisconsin at Shadow Hill Ranch. The event was awarded the "Festival of the Year" Academy of Country Music Award in 2015.

The festival is typically run from Thursday through Sunday during the third weekend of July. In the past, performers like Luke Bryan, Sam Hunt, Toby Keith, and Dierks Bentley have appeared.

== Craven, Saskatchewan ==
In 2005, Troy Vollhoffer, owner of parent company Premier Global Productions, took over Craven, Saskatchewan's Rock 'N The Valley festival and relaunched it as the Craven Country Jamboree — returning the event to its previous roots as a country music festival. On October 27, 2016, it was announced that the event had been integrated into the Country Thunder brand as Country Thunder Saskatchewan.

== Calgary, Alberta ==
In August 2016, Country Thunder launched Country Thunder Alberta in Calgary, Alberta, located in Prairie Winds Park. The 2020 and 2021 editions were cancelled due to COVID-19; the festival returned in 2022, moving to Fort Calgary. Previous headliners have included Big & Rich, Tim McGraw, Brad Paisley, Blake Shelton, Toby Keith, and Morgan Wallen.

The 2026 edition moved from an August scheduling to a June scheduling immediately prior to the Calgary Stampede; the festival was cancelled on June 24, 2026—two days before it was set to begin—with organizers citing "active construction surrounding the festival site and new restrictive sound limitations" as having restricted access to areas of the festival site, and prevented safe transportation. Organizers denied that the cancellation was related to ticket sales. Mayor Jeromy Farkas accused festival organizers of making "broad accusations" against the city, stating that the cited construction "did not appear overnight" and "no safety plan [was] rejected by the city, no required access route [was] denied by the city, and no specific safety requirement [was] left unresolved". He also accused the festival of "bandwagon[ing] and dogpil[ing]" upon misinformation associated with noise permit restrictions imposed on the Cowboys Music Festival, which were not applicable to Country Thunder. The city stated that it had been working with Country Thunder to coordinate construction as to not disrupt the festival.

The 2027 edition was cancelled as of October 30, 2026.

== Kissimmee, Florida ==
In March 2019, Country Thunder launched the festival in Kissimmee, Florida, located in Osceola Heritage Park. Previous headliners have included Luke Bryan, Toby Keith, and Luke Combs.

== Winnipeg, Manitoba ==
In July 2025, Country Thunder launched Thunder Stadium Concert Series in Winnipeg, Manitoba, located at Princess Auto Stadium. One day is Country Thunder and the other is Rockin' Thunder. Previous headliners have included Def Leppard, Riley Green, Mötley Crüe, Kane Brown, and Bailey Zimmerman.

== Edmonton, Alberta ==
In July 2025, Country Thunder launched Rockin' Thunder Alberta in Edmonton, Alberta, located at the Exhibition Lands Racetrack. Previous headliners have included Def Leppard, Weezer, Three Days Grace, and Creed.

== Festival of the Year ==
Country Thunder Wisconsin 2015 and Country Thunder Arizona 2018 were named Festival of the Year by the Academy of Country Music.
