= Welded sculpture =

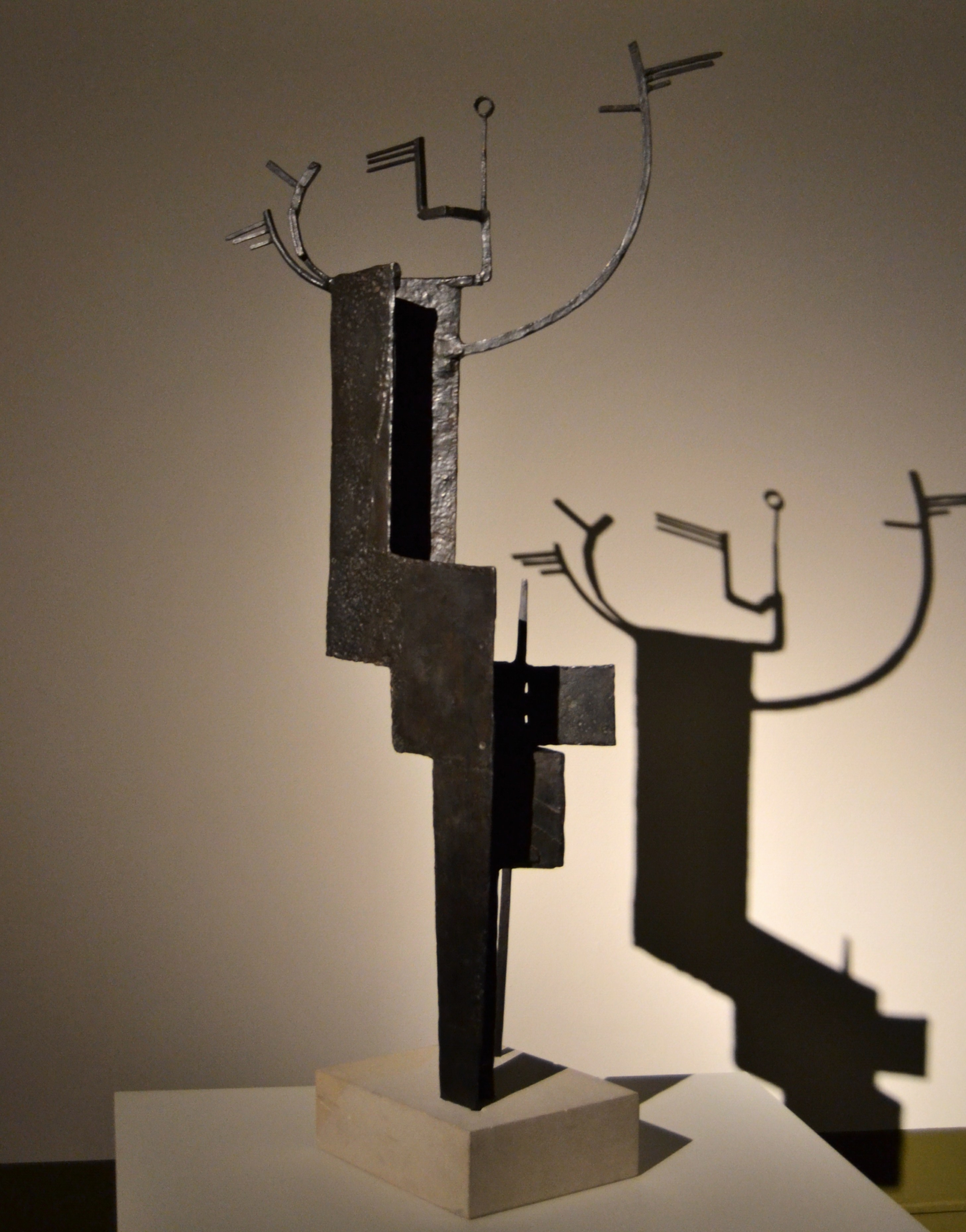
Daphné, Julio González, bronze fos, 140 x 66 x 29 cm. 1937, Institut Valencià d'Art Modern.

Welded sculpture (related to visual art and works of art) is an art form in which sculpture is made using welding techniques.

== History ==
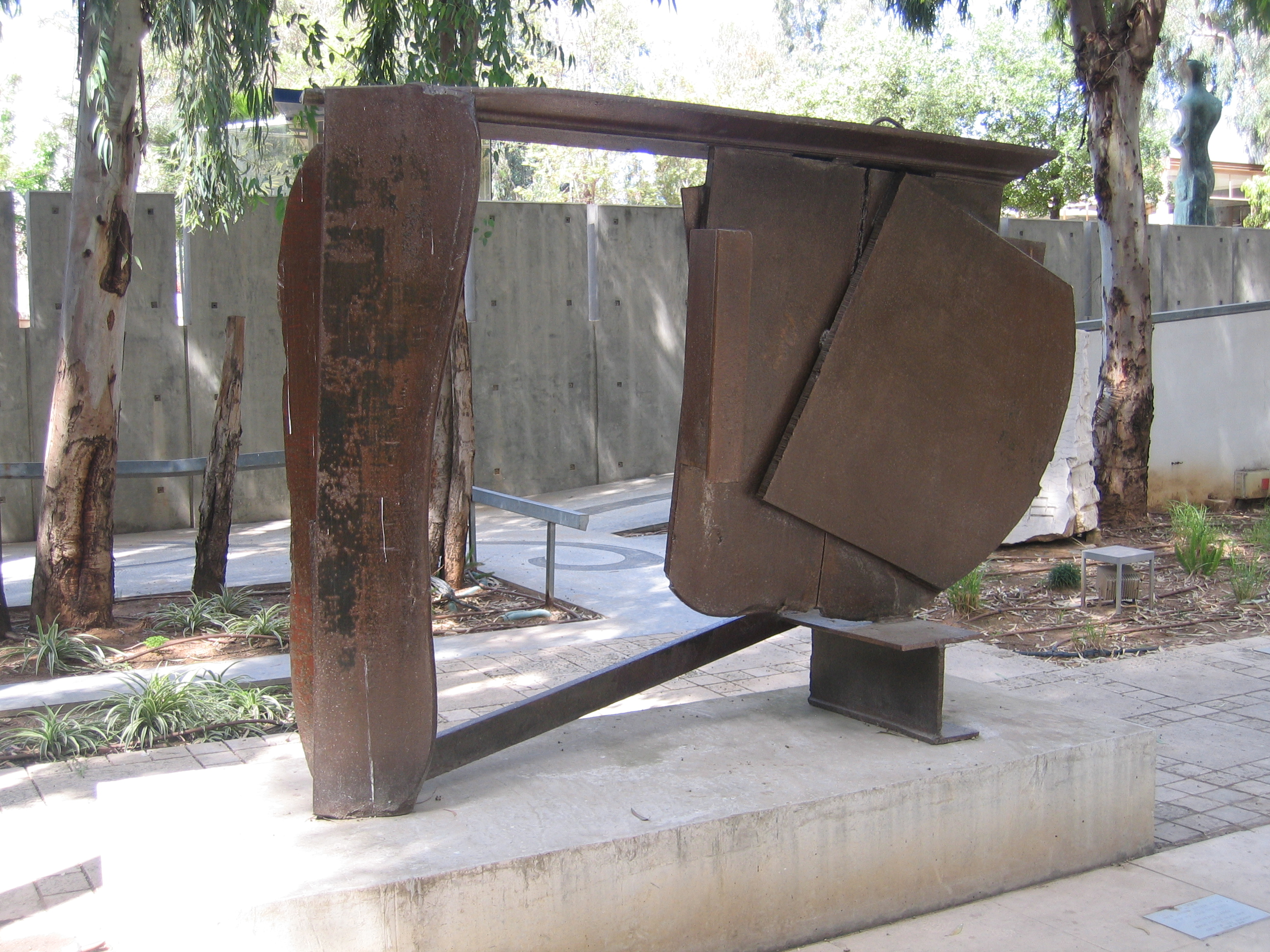
Anthony Caro, Black Cover Flat, 1974

Welded sculptures have a relatively short history, dating back only to the 20th century. Before the development of current welding technology, sculptures made from metal were either cast or forged, and welding was primarily used in the construction industry.

The first welded sculptures were credited to the Russian artist Vladimir Tatlin, who created his first piece of art in 1913. Tatlin was an important figure in the Russian Constructivist movement, which influenced the use of industrial materials in forms they had not yet been used in, mainly art.

In the 1920s and 1930s, more artists followed this path and the experimenting and artistic work of metalworking came to light. Some of the earliest founders in this practice included Julio Gonzalez, and Alexander Calder. Gonzalez was credited and noticed for his welded sculptures that were not only expressive in an abstract manner but functional as well. Calder’s pieces are among some of the most famous examples of welded sculptures, as they often hang from ceilings or trees. They were mobile structures that responded to air currents, moving in mesmerizing ways that were intriguing to the human eye.

The Catalan artist Julio González is credited as one of the most well known developers of welded sculpture. González came from a line of metalsmith workers; his grandfather was a goldsmith in Galicia, who established in the Catalan capital in the early 19th century. González's father, Concordio González, owned a workshop and as a young boy, González learned from him the techniques of gold, silver, and iron metalwork. He is associated with the Spanish circle of artists of Montmartre, including Pablo Gargallo, Juan Gris and Max Jacob. In 1918, he developed an interest in the artistic possibilities of welding, after learning the technique whilst working in the Renault Factory at Boulogne-Billancourt. This technique would subsequently become his principal contribution to sculpture, though during this period he also painted and —especially— created jewellery pieces. In 1920 he renewed his acquaintance with Pablo Picasso, for whom he later provided technical assistance in executing sculptures in iron, participating to Picasso's researches on analytic cubism. He also forged the infrastructures of Constantin Brâncuși's plasters. In the winter of 1927-28, he showed Picasso how to use oxy-fuel welding and cutting. When their friendship re-established itself, Picasso and González collaborated on a piece called Woman in the Garden between 1928-1930. From October 1928 till 1932, both men worked together. Influenced by Picasso, the fifty-year-old González changed his style, exchanging bronze for iron, and volumes for lines. González began to formalize a new visual language in sculpture that would change the course of his career.

During the mid-20th century, welded sculptures continued to evolve, artists now have access to different materials, techniques, and technology that weren’t available to the early founders. In the 1950s and 1960s, large-scale industrial materials such as steel beams and large plates were utilized to construct monumental sculptures that were march larger than the ones in the past. Artists such as David Smith, Anthony Caro, and Richard Serra were among the first group of artists to create these large-scale sculptures.

Today, welded sculptures are an established form of contemporary art, with artists continuously pushing the boundaries of what’s possible with modern materials and technology.

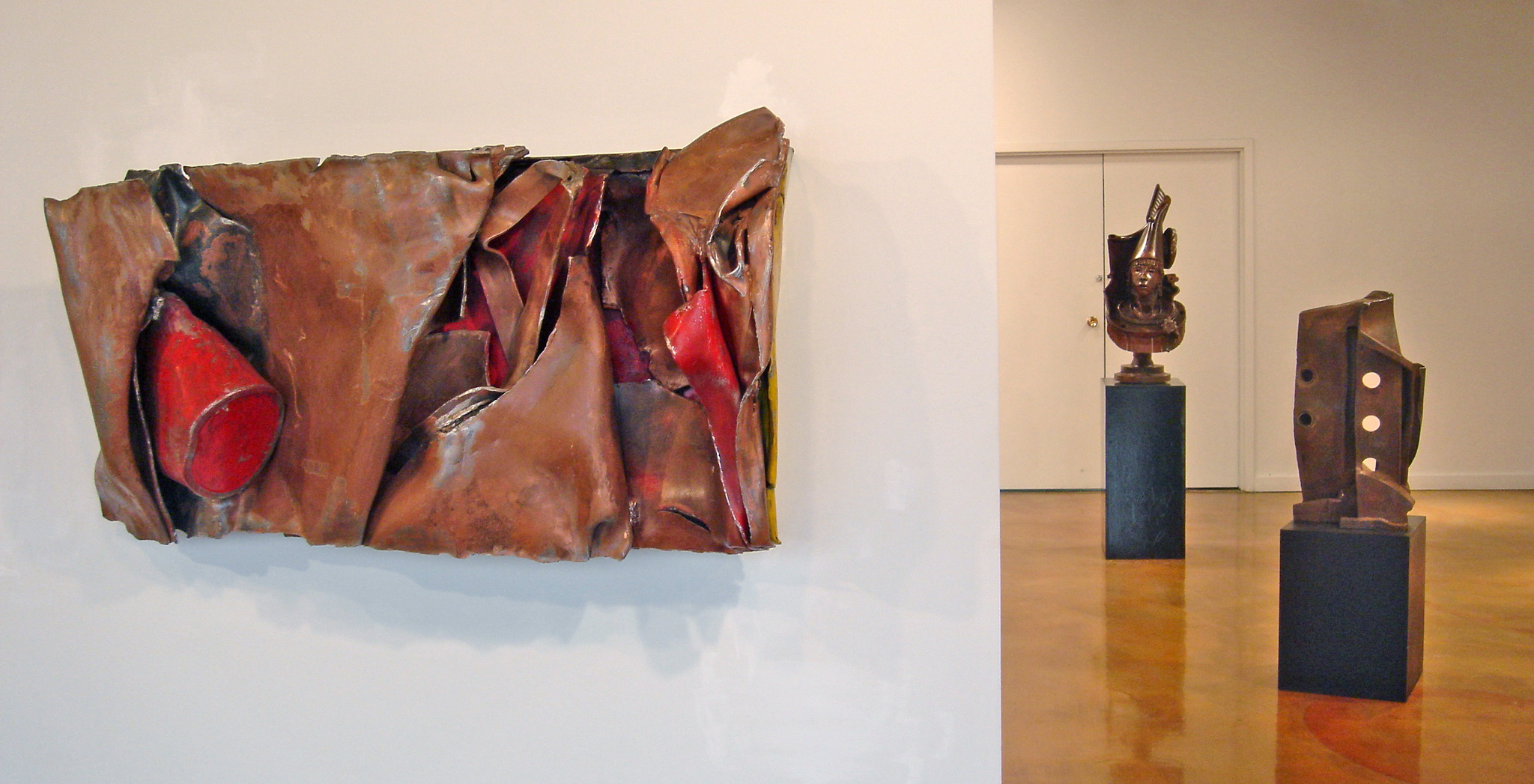
Sculptures by North Edmonton Sculpture Workshop artists Andrew French, Ryan McCourt, and Robert Willms.

Welding was increasingly used in sculpture from the 1930s as new industrial processes such as arc welding were adapted to aesthetic purposes. Welding techniques, including digital cutting, can be used to cut and join metal. Welded sculptures are sometimes site-specific. Artist Richard Hunt said "The idea of exploiting welding methods and the tensile strength of metals opened up many possibilities to me. This idea was actually linked to the increasing recognition among artists that an art which was representative of our own time ought to use materials and techniques that were at hand, whether it was new experiments using plastics, new kinds of paints, new kinds of surfaces in painting, or using materials developed during the war effort.""

== Associated artists ==
- Aleš Veselý
- Alexander Calder
- Andrew French
- Anthony Caro
- Antoine Pevsner
- Beverly Pepper
- Bruce Gray
- Charles Ginnever
- David Smith
- Eila Hiltunen
- James Rosati
- John Raymond Henry
- Julio González
- Ken Macklin
- Kevin Caron
- Lyman Kipp
- Nancy Graves
- Paul Kuniholm
- Pablo Gargallo
- Pablo Picasso
- Peter Hide
- Peter Reginato
- Revs
- Richard Serra
- Richard Hunt
- Robert H. Hudson
- Robert Willms
- Royden Mills
- Ryan McCourt
- Tim Scott
- TEJN
- Todor Todorov
- Vera Mukhina
