= Andrew French (sculptor) =

English sculptor

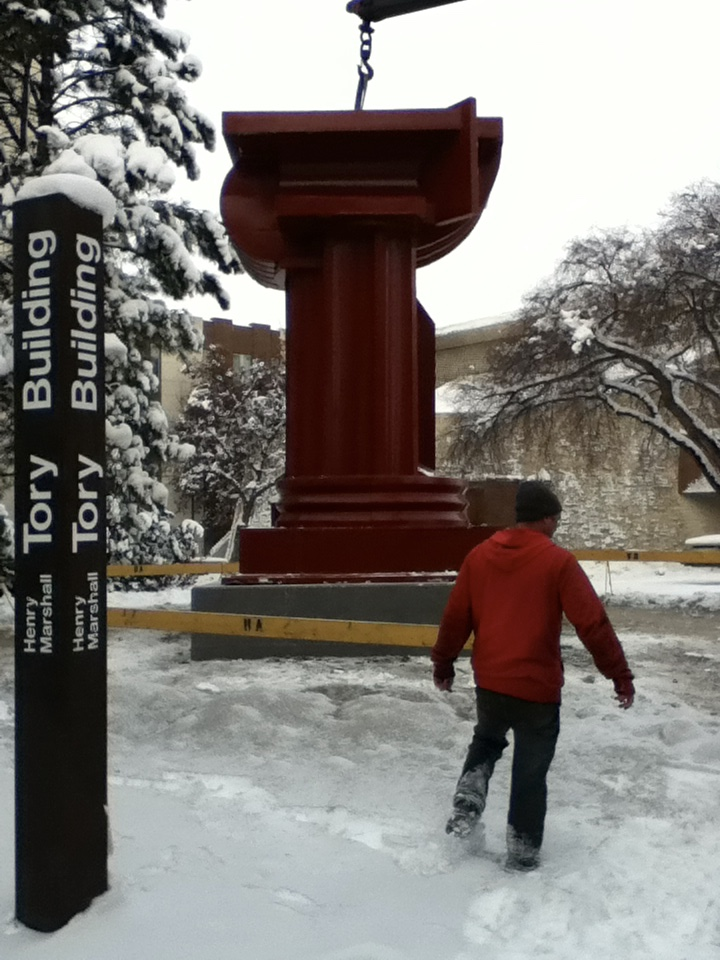
- Born: UK
- Education: Newbury College (England), Kent Institute of Art & Design, University of Alberta
- Known for: Sculpture
- Notable work: "Pillar", "Still Life", "The Abduction of St. Paul"
- Movement: Modern art

Andrew Michael French is an English-born abstract sculptor. A one-time pupil of Peter Hide, French is best known for upright, large-scale welded sculptures made of brightly painted steel. With sculptors Mark Bellows, Bianca Khan, Rob Willms, and Ryan McCourt, Andrew French is identified as part of the "Next Generation" of Edmonton Sculpture.

Educated at Newbury College (England), and Kent Institute of Art & Design with a BFA in Sculpture, French completed his Master of Fine Arts at the University of Alberta in 1999. French's 1999 sculpture "Pillar" is located on the University of Alberta campus, his sculpture "Still Life" is in the collection of the CIty of Edmonton, installed in Belgravia Art Park and his small soldered brass piece "The Abduction of St. Paul" is in the collection of the Alberta Foundation for the Arts.

Andrew French is a co-founder of the North Edmonton Sculpture Workshop. His sculptures have been seen in a number of important exhibitions in Edmonton, including the Chichester Festival, Big Things, the Edmonton Contemporary Artists' Society, and the Alberta Centennial Sculpture Exhibition at the Royal Alberta Museum, and Sculpture by Invitation at the Shaw Conference Centre.

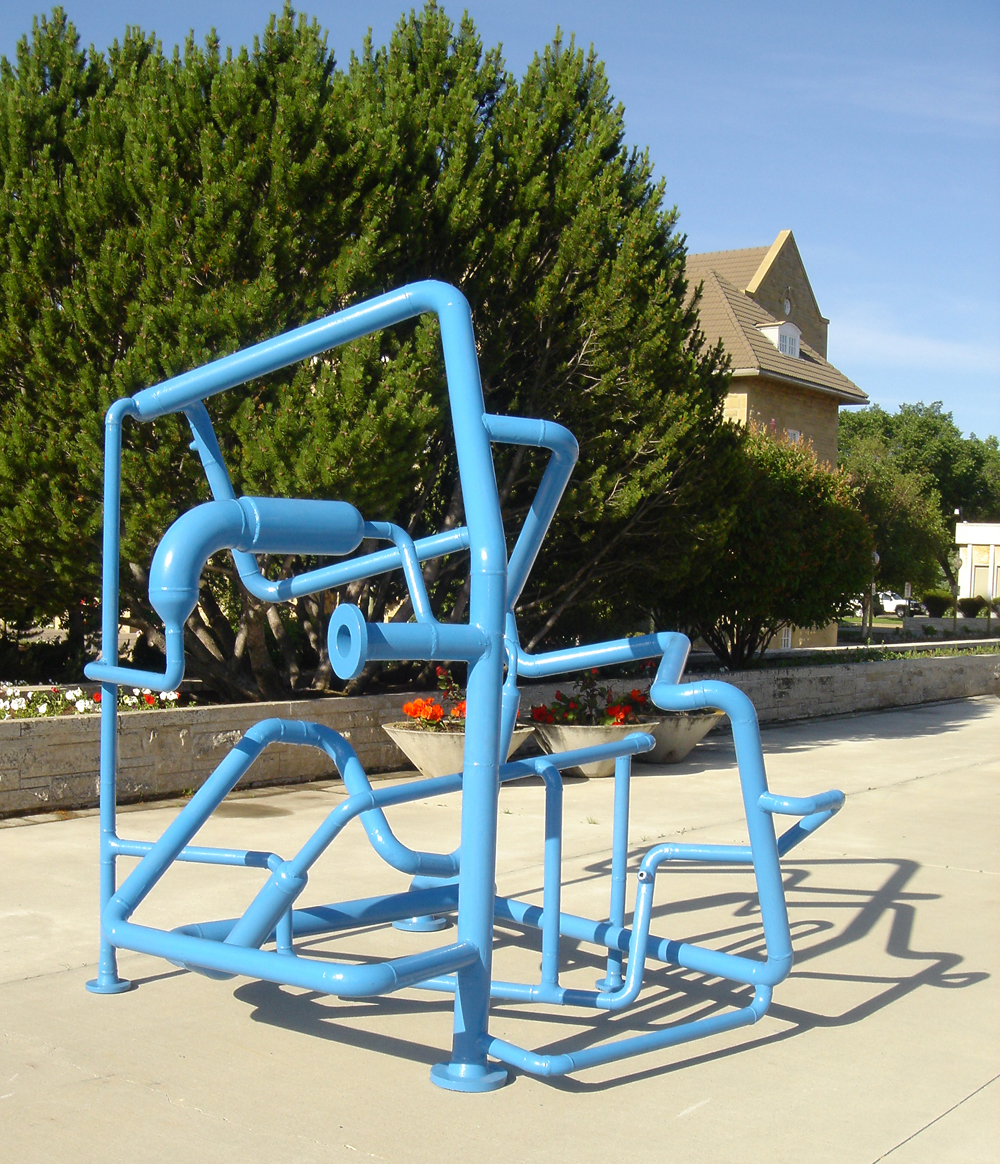
"Don't Cry For Me," by Andrew French, displayed in the Alberta Centennial Sculpture Exhibition at the Royal Alberta Museum in 2005.
