= Big Things =

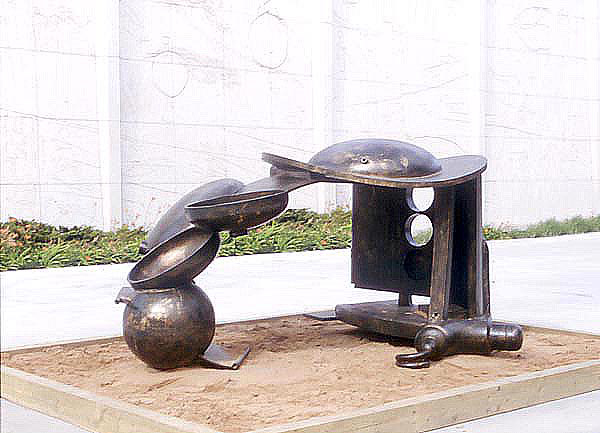
"Spanish Castle," by Ryan McCourt, on display in the North Edmonton Sculpture Workshop's first "Big Things" exhibition, at the Royal Alberta Museum in 2002.

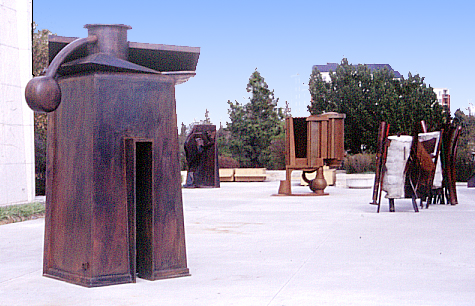
Installation view of sculptures by Royden Mills, Peter Hide, Ryan McCourt, and Ken Macklin, in the North Edmonton Sculpture Workshop's "Big Things 2" exhibition at the Royal Alberta Museum in 2003.

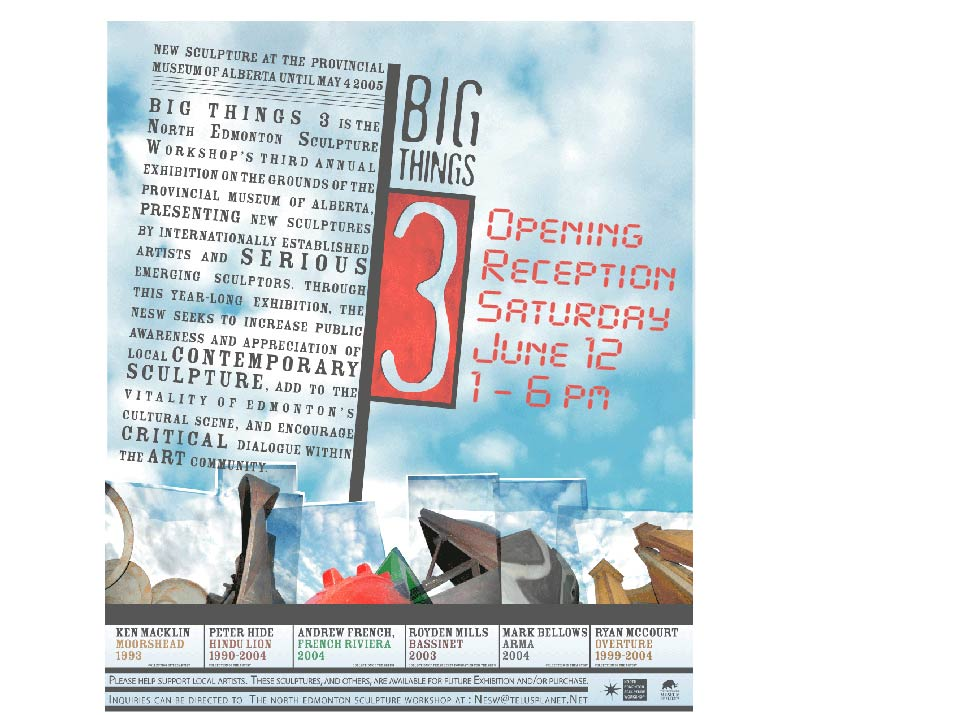
Poster image for the North Edmonton Sculpture Workshop's "Big Things 3" exhibition at the Royal Alberta Museum in 2004.

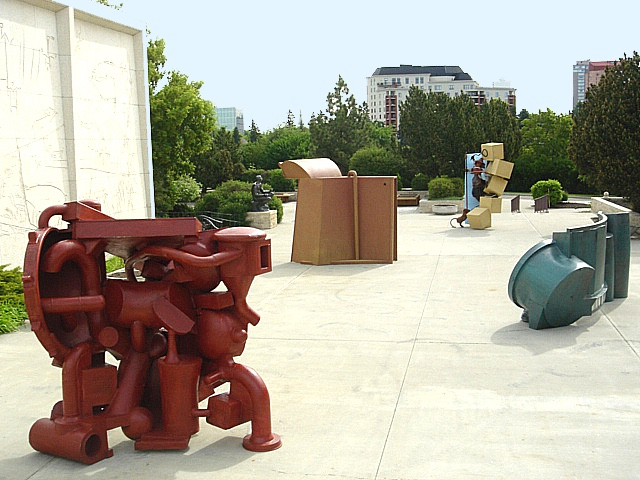
Installation view of sculptures by Andrew French, Royden Mills, Ryan McCourt, and Bianca Khan, in the North Edmonton Sculpture Workshop's 2006 "Big Things 4" exhibition at the Royal Alberta Museum.

Big Things was a large-scale steel sculpture exhibition series organized by the North Edmonton Sculpture Workshop for the Royal Alberta Museum's outdoor South Terrace. The exhibition series began as an effort to "expose the public to the richness and diversity of contemporary sculpture in steel, while encouraging a critical dialogue between artists."

== Big Things ==
The inaugural Big Things exhibition in 2002 was the first time the Royal Alberta Museum had ever displayed an exhibition of its kind, featuring nine large, abstract steel sculptures. According to the museum's assistant director Tim Willis, "Dealing with abstract sculpture is not part of our core mandate.... It just goes to show how art can transform an inert public space." Artist Ryan McCourt sought out the venue in part for its cultural context, and in part due to the inherent practicality of the site. "The context of it being at a museum was much more appropriate than having it at the Law Courts or outside the Shaw Conference Centre," says McCourt, while also noting that the museum's large stone facade and open concrete terrace space is especially conducive to viewing large sculptures. Exhibited sculptures included Tilley, by Mark Bellows; Valour and Cowardice, by Andrew French; Radiant, by Peter Hide; Midway, by Ken Macklin; The Moment You've Been Waiting For and Spanish Castle, by Ryan McCourt; Almost Whole, by Royden Mills; and From the Model, by Susan Owen Kagan.

== Big Things 2 ==
Due to the success of the premiere exhibition, originally scheduled to just last the summer, Big Things was held over until May 2003, when it was immediately followed by Big Things 2, shown from May 6, 2003 to April 30, 2004. Big Things 2 featured work by the same artists as in the first showing, minus Kagan. Exhibited works include Lust or Love?, by Mark Bellows; Florence, by Andrew French; Modernist Man, by Peter Hide; Easter Sunday, by Ken Macklin; Inside Elevation, by Royden Mills; and Solus, by Ryan McCourt.

== Big Things 3 ==
Big Things 3 followed, on display from May 8, 2004 - April 30, 2005, with the same roster of exhibiting artists. The sculptures exhibited include Moorshead, by Ken Macklin; Hindu Lion, by Peter Hide; French Riviera, by Andrew French; Bassinet, by Royden Mills; Arma, by Mark Bellows; and Overture, by Ryan McCourt.

== Big Things 4 ==
Big Things 4, from June 3 to October 1, 2006, featured sculptures "Petra" by Simon Black; "Truth and Falsehood" by Andrew French; "Leviathan" by Peter Hide; "Caesura" by Bianca Khan; "Destroyer of Obstacles" by Ryan McCourt; "Between Premonition" by Royden Mills; and "Trojan Yak Genera" by Robert Willms.

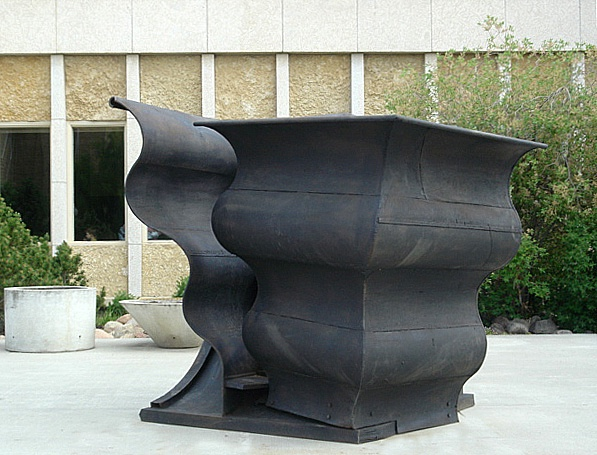
"Petra" by Simon Black

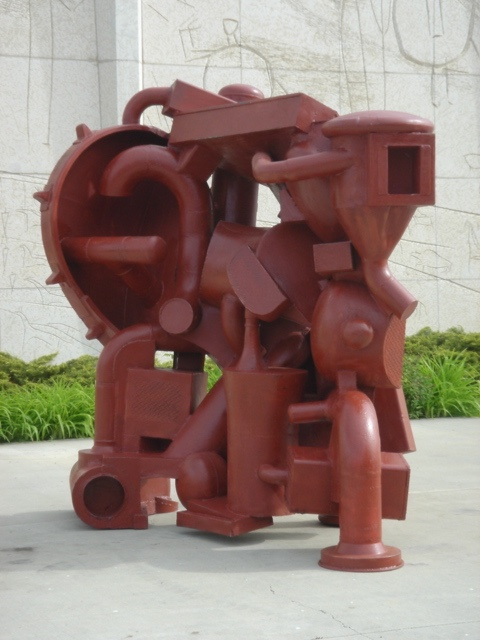
"Truth and Falsehood" by Andrew French

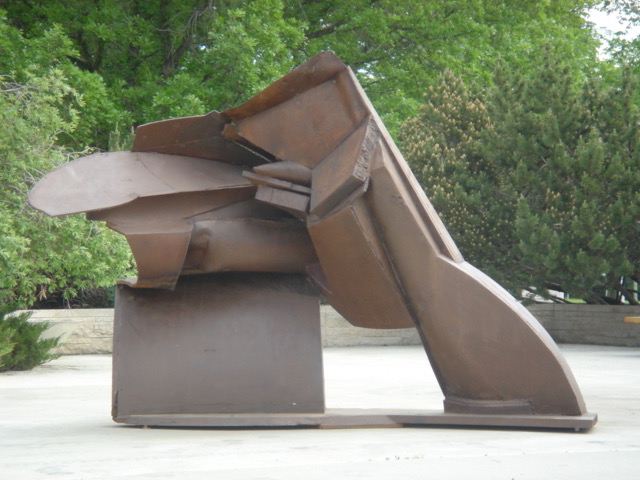
"Leviathan" by Peter Hide

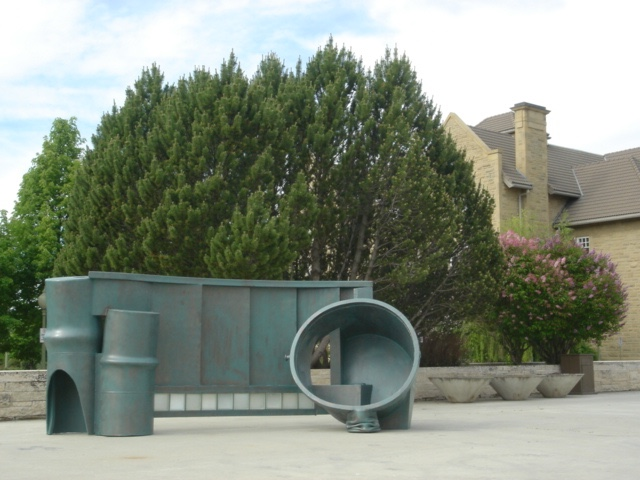
"Caesura" by Bianca Khan

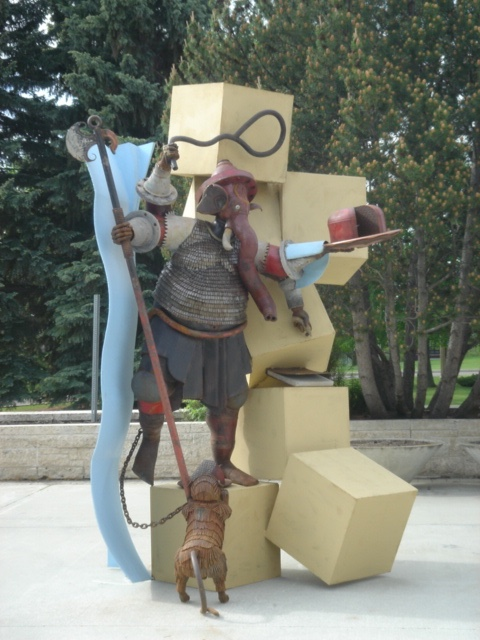
"Destroyer of Obstacles" by Ryan McCourt

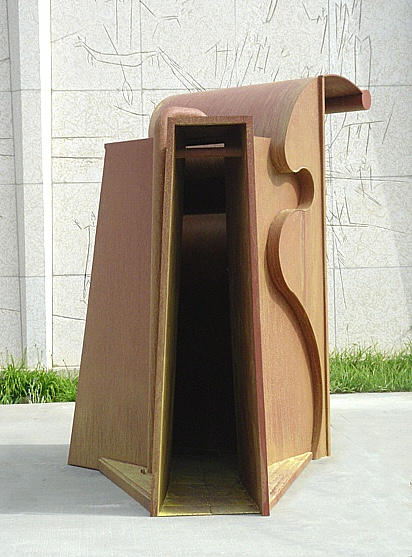
"Between Premonition" by Royden Mills

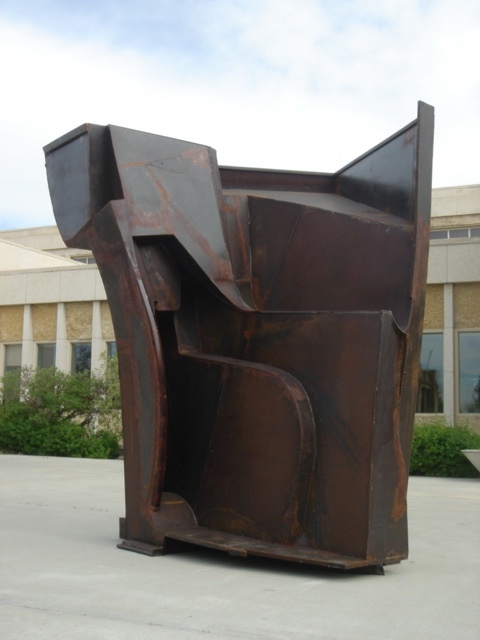
"Trojan Yak Genera" by Robert Willms
