= Harcourt House, Edmonton =

Artist-run centre in Alberta, Canada

Coordinates: 53°32′35″N 113°30′48″W

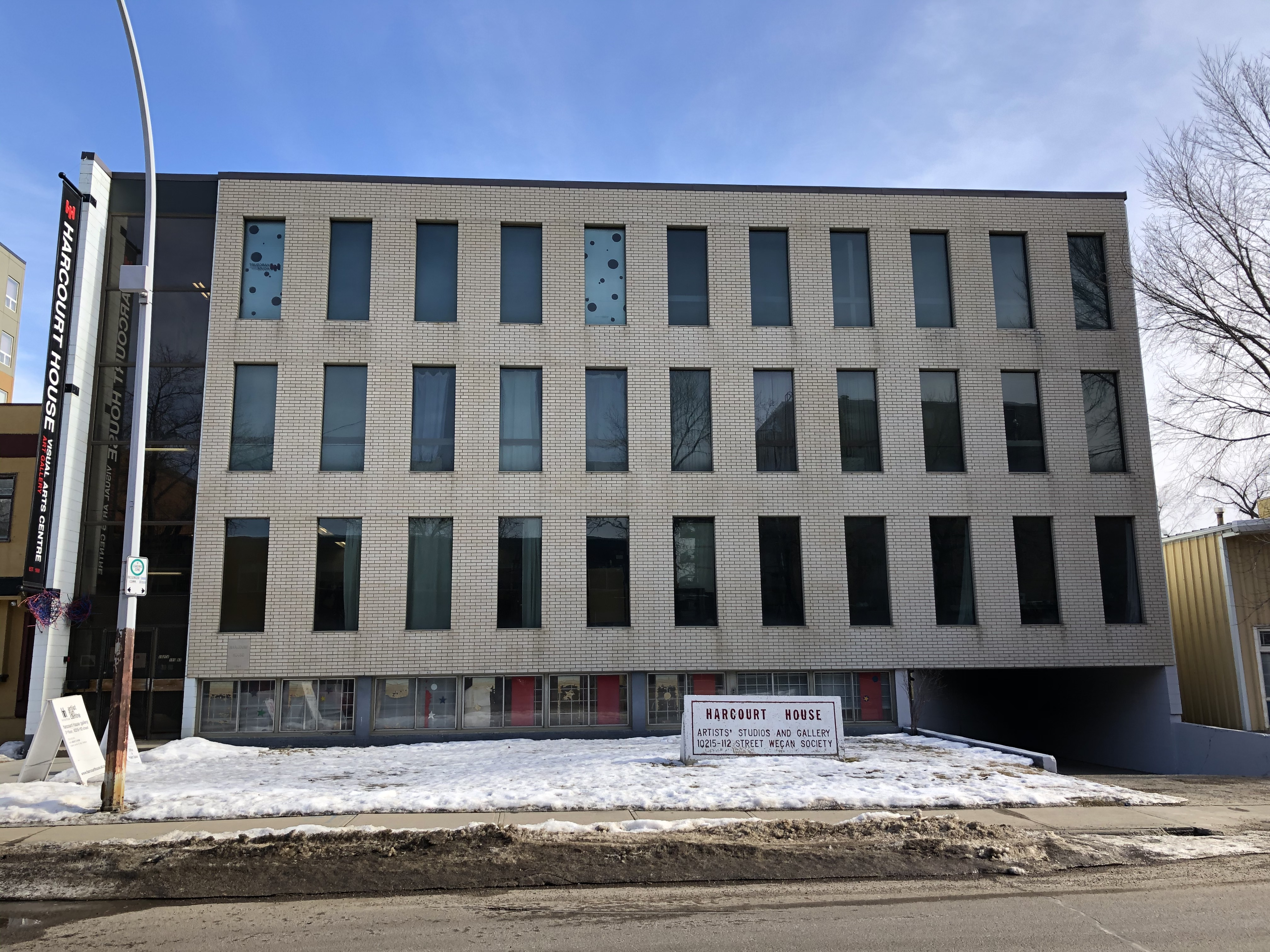
Exterior of Harcourt House Artist Run Centre at 10215 – 112 Street, Edmonton

Harcourt House Artist Run Centre is one of four artist-run centres in Edmonton, Alberta, Canada. The centre delivers a host of services to both artists and the community, and acts as an alternative site for the presentation, distribution and promotion of contemporary art.

Harcourt House Artist Run Centre is an artist-run, charitable organization that promotes contemporary visual art to interested individuals and organizations by providing education, exhibitions and resources. The Centre includes two public gallery spaces; and as the single largest community of visual artists in Edmonton, it offers 42 low-rent studios for local practicing artists and other non-profit arts related organizations. A unique area of programming to Harcourt House is the Art Enrichment program that serves over 25 local low income and special needs organizations with low/no cost art education classes.

== History ==
The WECAN Society (Where Edmonton Community Artist Network) was incorporated in 1987 after forming the "Artists For Tornado Relief", a successful art auction organized by Edmonton artists to help victims of the 1987 Edmonton tornado. Following this event, the energized group of artists devoted their attention into creating a permanent arts centre. In September 1988 the WECAN Society acquired the Harcourt House buildings from the provincial government located at 112th St. and 102 Ave. in downtown Edmonton, where the facility is still located today.

Public gallery status and charitable status were granted to the organization in 1990. Harcourt House has received its core funding from the Alberta Foundation for the Arts, the City of Edmonton and the Edmonton Arts Council. Additional funding has been obtained from the Clifford E. Lee Foundation, Alberta Advanced Education and Career Development, the Government of Canada and both individual and corporate donations. Harcourt House is a member organization of the Alberta Association of Artist-run Centres (AAARC).

In 2023, it was announced that Harcourt House was in danger of closing after the provincial government declined to renew its lease. The organization was given a year to raise $3.5 million to buy the buildings from Alberta Infrastructure. In 2025, it was announced that a federal grant of $1 million, together with $2.5 million raised by the WECAN Society, would allow Harcourt House to remain in the building.

== Architecture ==
Located in Wîhkwêntôwin, Edmonton, at 10215 112 St., Harcourt House is spread over two buildings and contains education facilities and 42 rental studios. The main gallery, located on the third floor, focuses on established and professional artists, while the incubator gallery is dedicated to emerging and recent art school graduates from the Edmonton area. Architects Dennis & Freda O’Connor Architects cut the ribbon on the Harcourt House building itself in 1960.

Originally built in 1965 for businessman Robert Earle Harcourt and designed for a northern transportation company, the building has served as a vital community hub and since 1988 has been operated by the WECAN Society as a center for artists' studios and exhibitions.

On March 17, 2026, the City of Edmonton designated Harcourt House as a Municipal Historic Resource, recognizing its significance as a premier example of International Style architecture designed by Freda O’Connor, the first woman to lead a professional architectural association in Canada.

== Notable Leadership ==
In 2016, the Board of Directors at Harcourt House Artist Run Centre announced Jacek Malec as the new Executive Director. Having previously held roles as the Chief Curator and co-founder of Art Forum Gallery, Director and Curator at the Museum of Contemporary Art Calgary, and the Chief Curator of Collections at the Aero Space Museum of Calgary, Malec has over 25 years of experience in the arts and culture community. He was born in 1957 in Kalisz, Poland, and graduated from the University of Wroclaw where he studied Art History, Museology, and Curatorial Studies. He is an art-historian, critic, and lecturer, and in 2014 he was elected to the Board of Governors of the International Association of Art Critics (AICA) - Canadian Chapter, where he currently holds a position of Vice President.

Prior to Jacek Malec, Stacey Cann was the Executive Director of Harcourt House from August 2014 to 2016. Stacey Cann is a multidisciplinary artist whose work has been shown at the Illingworth Kerr Gallery, The Ministry of Casual Living, Latitude 53 Contemporary Art, Harcourt House Artist Run Centre and the International Print Centre New York among others. Her work incorporates elements of time, and she is interested in how we present ourselves in the commonplace of our daily life. She has a Bachelor of Fine Arts degree in Print Media from Alberta College of Art and Design as well as a Masters of Arts in Art Education from Concordia University.

== Notable exhibitions ==
Edmonton and the Bauhaus

Curated by Jacek Malec in September 2019, Edmonton and the Bauhaus used scanned architectural prints, photographs, and Bauhaus chairs to show the progression of Bauhaus and its ever-lasting influence. In the first gallery, wall-mounted prints explained and detailed the Bauhaus School of Design. A replica of Gerrit Reitveld's "Red and Blue Chair" sat on a mantle in the middle of the exhibition. Edmonton and the Bauhaus also included a replica of Josef Hartwig’s “Bauhaus Chess Set," and prints of rarely seen archival photographs by Lucia Moholy of the Bauhaus era. Malec linked the exhibit to the centennial celebration of Bauhaus.

== Notable Artists ==
Notable contemporary artists who have shown at Harcourt over the years include Luke Lindoe, Peter Hide, Lyndal Osborne, Walter Jule, Liz Ingram, Violet Owen, Douglas Haynes, Robert Scott, Isla Burns, Clay Ellis, Chris Cran, Peter von Tiesenhausen and Lilian Klimek.
