= Ryan McCourt =

Canadian artist (born 1975)

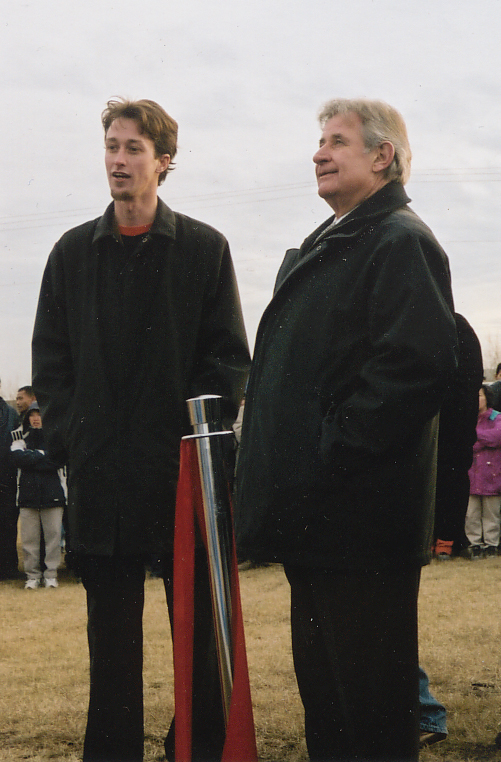
- Ryan McCourt and Alberta premier Ralph Klein at the unveiling of "A Modern Outlook" in Edmonton.
- Born: 1975 (age 50–51); Edmonton, Alberta, Canada
- Education: University of Alberta, Edmonton,
- Known for: Sculptor
- Notable work: "A Modern Outlook", "Will and Representation"
- Movement: modernism, late modernism, surrealism, abstraction
- Patrons: Robert T. Webb Sculpture Garden

Ryan McCourt (born February 23, 1975) is a Canadian artist best known for his sculptures. He lives in Edmonton, Alberta.

== Early life and education ==
Ryan David McCourt was born and raised in Edmonton, Alberta, the youngest of Ken and Sheelagh McCourt's five children. He attended school at Patricia Heights Elementary School, Hillcrest Junior High School, and Jasper Place High School. McCourt completed his Bachelor of Fine Arts in 1997, and his Master of Fine Arts in Sculpture in 1999, both at the University of Alberta There, McCourt was a student of Peter Hide and Edmonton's modernist tradition of welded sculpture.

== Career ==
In 1995, while an undergraduate student, McCourt was a photographer with the Edmonton Eskimos Football Club. After completing his MFA, McCourt worked as the Artistic Coordinator for The Works Art Expo 2001, and curated Resolutions, a solo exhibition of paintings by Canadian artist Tony Baker, at the Edmonton Art Gallery. In 2002, McCourt founded the North Edmonton Sculpture Workshop, "a cooperative shared-studio project focused on facilitating the creation and promotion of contemporary sculpture," producing the Big Things sculpture series at the Royal Alberta Museum from 2002 to 2006. In 2003, McCourt was an instructor of Visual Fundamentals at the University of Alberta. In 2004, alongside then-Alberta Premier Ralph Klein, McCourt unveiled his 5.5-meter tall commissioned sculpture entitled A Modern Outlook, at 18550-118A Avenue in Edmonton. McCourt organized the Alberta Centennial Sculpture Exhibition at the Royal Alberta Museum in 2005. In 2025, recording under the name "The Synthesist," McCourt released two albums of music: "The Objectivity of Taste" and "After Your Death." CKUA host Leo Cripps aired tracks from After Your Death on two consecutive broadcasts of his program Discoveries in January 2026, publicly praising the music. CKUA subsequently declined to add the albums to their library, citing an unwritten policy against airing music created using generative AI tools.

== Controversy ==
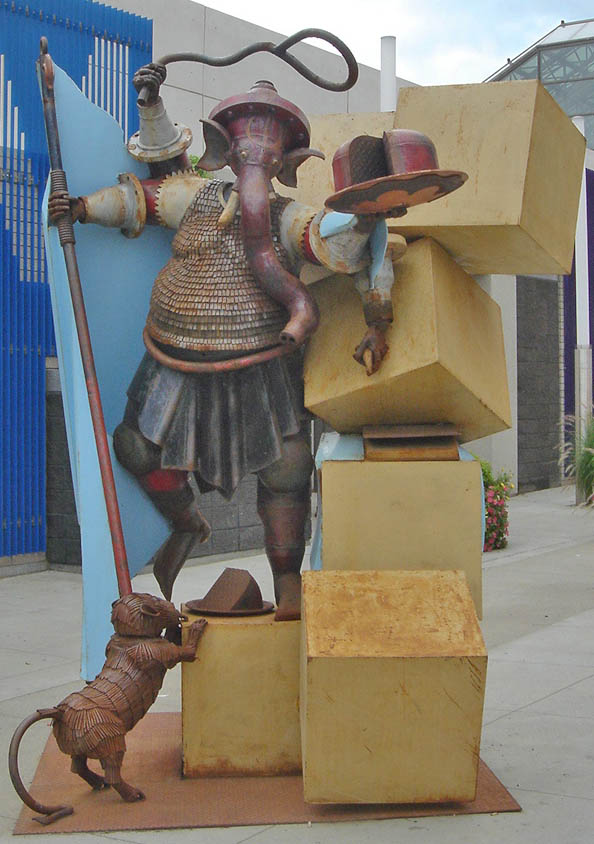
"Destroyer of Obstacles," by Ryan McCourt, was ordered removed from public display by Edmonton Mayor Stephen Mandel in 2007

In 2006, McCourt was the first artist selected to display sculpture for one year outside Edmonton's Shaw Conference Centre. McCourt's exhibition, Will and Representation, was an installation of four large sculptures based on Ganesha, a deity from Hindu mythology. Ten months into the exhibition, then-Mayor of Edmonton Stephen Mandel ordered the works removed after reportedly receiving a 700-name petition complaining of the sculptures' "disrespectful" nudity. When asked for comment, McCourt stated that "Nudity seems like a rather quaint thing to get one's knickers in a bunch over, in the 21st century. Besides, there's lots of art that I don't like, I don't go around gathering signatures of people who agree with me, and try to force the art to come down. That would be truly offensive, especially in a democracy like Canada."

Media coverage of the sculptures' removal was widespread, with articles appearing in the news as far away as India. Public reaction to Mandel's censorship decree was generally disapproving. In an interview with the Edmonton Journal's Paula Simons, David Goa, religious scholar, cultural anthropologist, and director of the University of Alberta's Chester Ronning Centre for the Study of Religion and Public Life, states "In India, Lord Ganesha is on everything – playing cards, advertising signs, lotto tickets, even diapers, I suspect." Simons concludes, "In his haste to appease a few protesters, the mayor, usually a champion of the arts, made a serious error in judgment. Instead of giving McCourt's divinely inspired statues the bum's rush, we should be celebrating this Canadian cross-pollination of cultures and aesthetic forms". The Globe and Mail's columnist Margaret Wente agreed with Simons: "The mayor, of course, was quite wrong. Mr. McCourt's sculptures did not insult the Hindu community. They insulted a small but vocal conservative religious group that is about as representative of Hindus as Hassidic Jews are of Jews.... There's a big difference between respecting different cultures and caving in to illiberalism and superstition."

Despite such negative responses in the media to art censorship in Canada, in 2014 the Edmonton Arts Council subsequently refused a donation of one of McCourt's sculptures, Destroyer of Obstacles, evidently because the sculpture had genitalia beneath its clothes. After meeting with seven Hindu community group representatives to seek out their opinion of the donation, the Edmonton Arts Council received a response that McCourt's sculpture was "an offense to their religion" and that the ban enacted by Mayor Mandel should remain in place. As a result of this consultation, "the Public Art Committee unanimously voted to decline acceptance of the gift, as the artwork did not meet 'community or civic suitability' criteria." In McCourt's view, "It is not the purpose of a city's public art collection to placate special interests," he says. "I want Edmonton to build the best civic art collection that we can get, never mind the politics, the religion, etc. of the artists making the work."

In 2026, CKUA radio banned McCourt's music from its airwaves after learning it had been created using generative AI tools, despite the absence of a formal written policy governing AI-generated content at the time the decision was made.

McCourt's reputation as a controversial artist goes beyond the issue of censorship. Protesting the exclusivity of a local National Portrait Gallery exhibition, McCourt "sent in an anonymous mock-up of Ingres' Napoleon as Jupiter Enthroned redone with Stephen Harper's face along with a fabricated letter from the Prime Minister of Canada. His anonymous submission was immediately accepted into the show and became the poster child of the exhibit." McCourt has publicly advocated for civic investment in the arts, and for the University of Alberta to move its Department of Art and Design to a downtown campus. McCourt has been a vocal critic of public art in Edmonton, dismissing Talus Dome, a much-maligned sculpture purchased by the city, as "an embarrassment to our citizens, a symbol of the Edmonton Arts Council's continued bungling of their portfolio, and an unforgivable waste of public funds."

== Common Sense ==
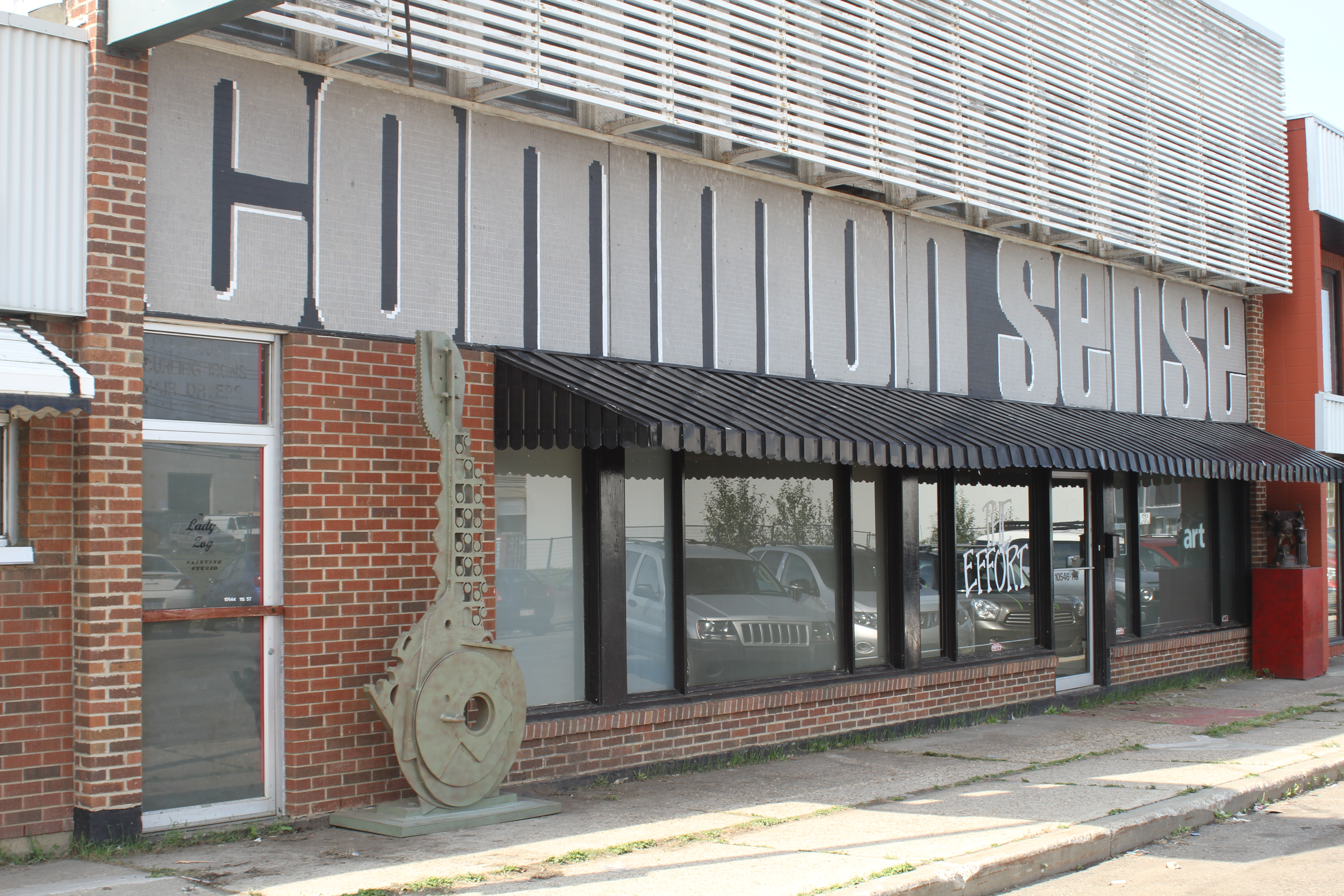
Common Sense, an artist run gallery in Edmonton, Alberta, owned by Canadian artist Ryan McCourt, photographed in 2014.

In 2007, McCourt opened Common Sense, a gallery space at 10546 – 115 street in downtown Edmonton, run by the North Edmonton Sculpture Workshop. With a mandate to give 100% of proceeds from art sales to exhibiting artists, Common Sense does not fit the mold of either a commercial gallery or a traditional artist run centre. According to art writer Amy Fung, "Common Sense is not actually an artist-run centre in any official sense, but a space run by artists in the old-fashioned sense.... essentially an artist's wet dream in our space-deprived city."

== Awards and collections ==
McCourt received the Lee Fund for the Arts Award; is a two-time recipient of the Edmonton Artists Trust Fund Award; and the recipient of a number of Project Grants from the Alberta Foundation for the Arts. His 2000 photograph After David, and 2003 sculpture Atlas are included in the Alberta Foundation for the Arts' collection. Fanfare, a steel sculpture by McCourt from 1999, is in the art collection of the University of Alberta. Honky Tonk, also from 1999, is in the collection of the Robert T. Webb Sculpture Garden. "The Abduction of Liberty, from 2006, was donated to the City of Edmonton and installed in the Belgravia Art Park in 2009. McCourt was awarded First Prize in the headdress category of the 2009 Wearable Art Awards in Port Moody, British Columbia for "The Helmet of Laocoön." In 2011, McCourt was named one of Edmonton's "Top 40 Under 40" by Avenue Edmonton for his support of local artists and his encouragement of "critical discourse". On August 19, 2016, McCourt's "Edmontonian Flag" was presented to Edmonton Mayor Don Iveson by Confederacy of Treaty Six First Nations Grand Chief Randy Ermineskin, "as a symbol of their commitment to collaboration, respectful dialogue and exploring shared opportunities" and "to symbolize a new dawn in Nation-to-Nation relationship building." In 2021, The Establishment Brewing Company commissioned McCourt to provide artwork for two beer labels, each one presenting a rotationally ambiguous image.
