= North Edmonton Sculpture Workshop =

Canadian arts collective

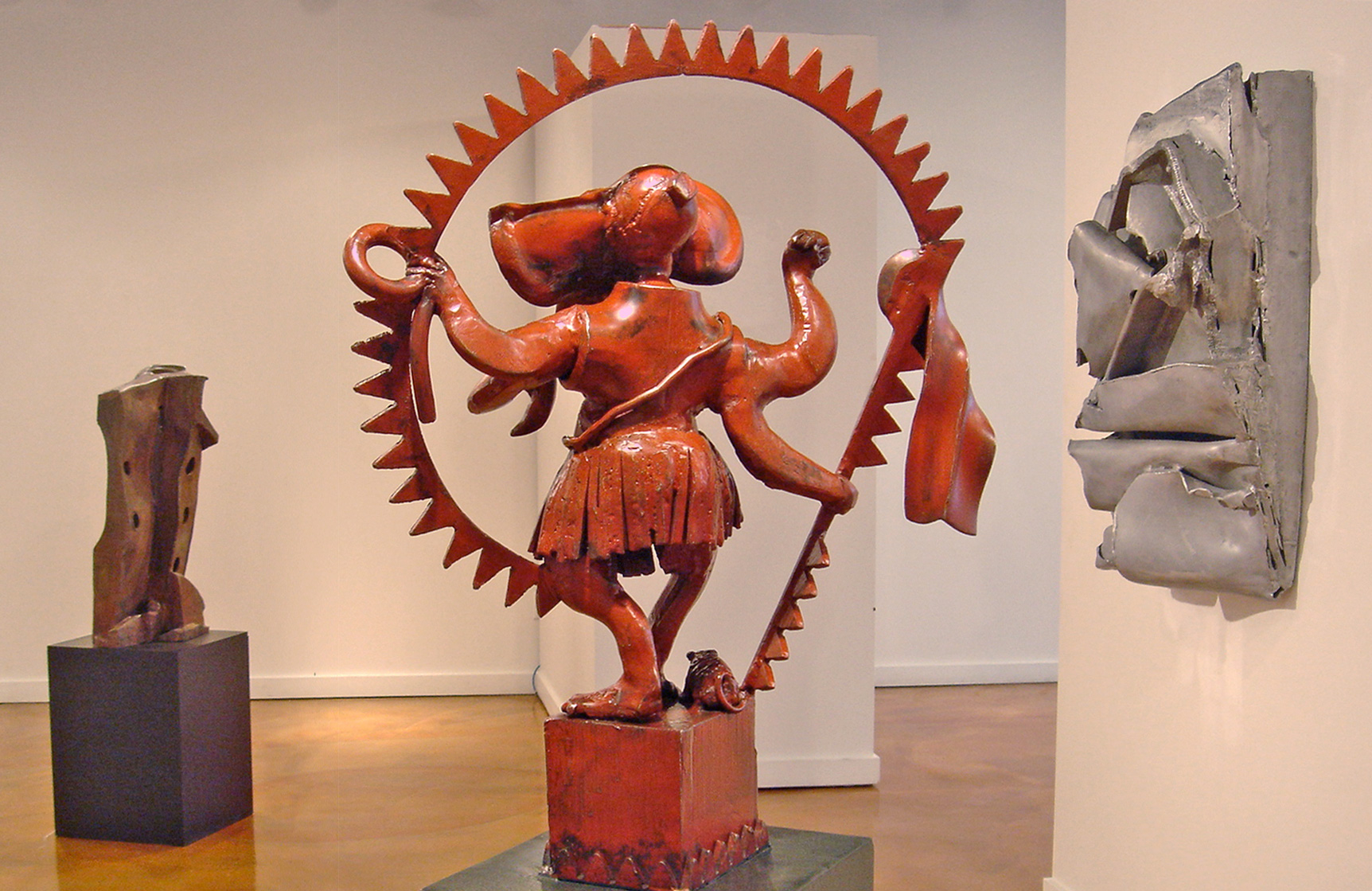
Installation view of the NESW's "New Directions" exhibition, featuring sculpture by Rob Willms, Ryan McCourt, and Andrew French.

The North Edmonton Sculpture Workshop (NESW) is an artist collective, or artist-run initiative, centred on a co-operative shared studio in Edmonton, Alberta, focused on "the creation and promotion of ambitious contemporary sculpture made using industrial processes and materials". The NESW name makes a symbolic reference to the cardinal directions in allusion to the idea of boundless exploration.

== History ==
The North Edmonton Sculpture Workshop was founded in 2002, with sculptors Mark Bellows, Andrew French, and Ryan McCourt as the resident artists. In its first year, the NESW produced four exhibitions in four different venues: "Front Room Sculpture" at Harcourt House; "North Edmonton Sculpture Workshop" at Global Visions Film Festival; "Desperate Measures" with The Works Society; and "Big Things" at the Royal Alberta Museum.

Sculptures by the North Edmonton Sculpture Workshop artists appeared in another 2002 Harcourt House exhibition: "Edmonton Sculpture: The Next Generation", an Edmonton sculpture survey show curated by Canadian artist, curator and critic Terry Fenton. In his accompanying essay, Fenton singles out the NESW artists:

"Andrew French, Mark Bellows, and Ryan McCourt share a studio, giving them the double advantage of being removed from the student environment while retaining continued access to one another for stimulation and criticism. This does not amount to their charting a common course. If anything, the shared studio has confirmed them in separate directions: the hothouse atmosphere appears to have stimulated both invention and individuality. Their work seems to be getting closer to the source of their inspiration, French's into the occupation of space by brute force, Bellows into a poetry of volume, McCourt into elegant profiles".

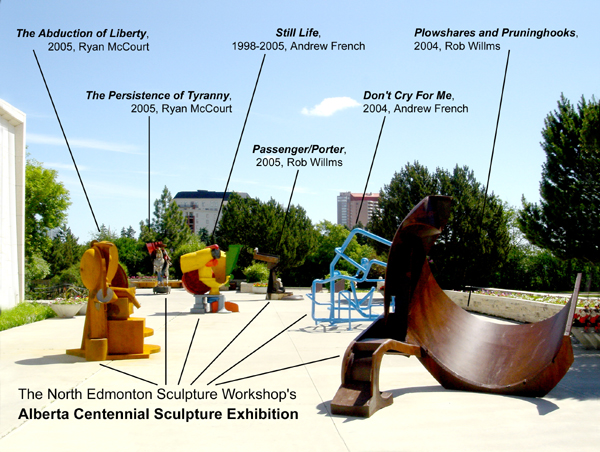
The sculptures on display at the Alberta Centennial Sculpture Exhibition at the Royal Alberta Museum in 2005.

The success of the North Edmonton Sculpture Workshop's first Big Things exhibition would lead to three more presentations in the series: Big Things 2 in 2003, Big Things 3 in 2004, and Big Things 4 in 2006. In 2005, in celebration of Alberta's centennial year, and the Museum's new Royal Charter from Queen Elizabeth II, the North Edmonton Sculpture Workshop presented the Alberta Centennial Sculpture Exhibition at the newly named Royal Alberta Museum.

== New Directions ==
Mark Bellows left the studio in 2005, while Robert Willms joined the NESW that same year. In 2007, the North Edmonton Sculpture Workshop moved into a large new facility, with 2100 square feet working space, concrete floors, 20-foot ceilings, and a 2,800-square-foot yard. As the Royal Alberta Museum grounds were unavailable to the group that year, the NESW exhibited "New Directions," a show of smaller works, at the Stollery Gallery in Edmonton. Upon touring the North Edmonton Sculpture Workshop in 2008, Edmonton arts writer Amy Fung called the studio "essentially an artist’s wet dream in our space-deprived city." In her view, the NESW was "certainly more impressive in size and facilities than existing local ARCs and arts initiatives such as ArtsHabitat". In 2008, the North Edmonton Sculpture Workshop presented "AUTOGRAPH: Sculpture and Drawing by Rob Willms", the inaugural exhibition in Common Sense, their new gallery space; and "Peter Hide @ The RAM," an exhibition of major works by Hide on the Royal Alberta Museum's outdoor sculpture patio.

According to a 2012 Edmonton Journal profile on the NESW, their ground level studio at 10546 - 115th street has 2100 square feet of concrete floor space, 20-foot-high ceilings, and a ten-foot by fourteen-foot sliding door that leads to a 2800-square-foot storage yard. Resident sculptors in 2012 include Ryan McCourt, Mark Bellows, Andrew French, Stephen Pardy and Robert Willms. From 2008 to 2024, the NESW gallery Common Sense presented nearly fifty exhibitions of artists from around the world working in a variety of media. The North Edmonton Sculpture Workshop formerly ran a widely read blog called Studiosavant, which discussed the Edmonton art scene.
