= Robert T. Webb Sculpture Garden =

Park in Dalton, Georgia, U.S.

- William Wareham's monumental painted steel sculpture "Duende" (2003) at the entrance to the garden
- Interactive map of Robert T. Webb Sculpture Garden
- Type: Admission Free Public Art Space
- Location: 520 West Waugh Street, Dalton, Georgia, United States
- Coordinates: 34.7759°N 84.97665°W
- Area: 5 acres (2.0 ha)
- Administrator: Amanda Brown
- Manager: Robert Webb
- Operator: Creative Arts Guild
- Visitors: Approximately 10,000 per year
- Open: All year
- Number of sculptures: 54 As of January 2021
- Website: www.creativeartsguild.org

The Robert T. Webb Sculpture Garden is a five-acre (2.0 ha) admission-free, open-air museum and sculpture park located in Dalton, Georgia, near Chattanooga, Tennessee, and is operated by the Creative Arts Guild, the state's oldest multi-disciplinary, community arts organization. The sculpture garden is the first permanent installation of its kind in the state of Georgia The garden features more than 50 outdoor sculptures in three sections of the Guild's property—the Ken and Myra White Magnolia Crescent, the Eli Rosen Garden and the Founders Garden—that provide an organic setting for the works, including mature trees, shrubs and flowers. The garden includes works by prominent artists such as Isamu Noguchi, Scott Burton, James Rosati, Betty Gold, Victor Salmones, Guy Dill, Chana Orloff, Felipe Castaneda and Ken Macklin. The Creative Arts Guild also maintains an indoor art gallery, which hosts rotating exhibits by local, regional and national artists. The sculpture garden welcomes approximately 10,000 visitors each year and is an educational resource for regional schools.

== History ==
The sculpture garden was launched in October 2010 after local businessperson and arts patron Robert Webb raised funds for the purchase of twelve garden scale and monumental works by U.S. and Canadian artists to complement a vintage Noguchi piece donated by George and Rhenda Spence and five works that had been gifted to the Creative Arts Guild by artists who participated in a 2003 juried exhibition curated by internationally renowned sculptor and arts advocate John Henry Webb worked with Guild executive director Terry Tomasello to grow the garden gradually, adding new work periodically during each subsequent year to maintain public interest while cultivating a sense of a unified whole in the work. The garden now features 52 works by artists from the U.S., Canada, Mexico, South America and Europe.

During 2020, the Guild celebrated the tenth anniversary of the sculpture garden by announcing a plan focusing on acquisition, re-siting, conservation, landscaping and illumination. Sixteen new works were added to the collection, bringing the total pieces on site to 54. Half of the new works were by female sculptors, two were by an Indigenous artist and one-third were by artists from Mexico or Latin America, reinforcing the Guild's commitment to an inclusive collection. Webb was particularly pleased to shift the placement of half the existing collection, noting that creating new environments for many of the works would give the audience a chance to see them with a fresh perspective.

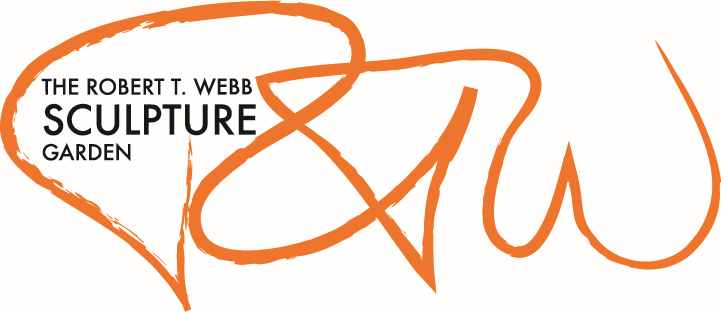

== Robert Webb ==
Robert Webb is a native of Dalton, Georgia, and a graduate of Emory University, where he launched the school's national literary journal, Lullwater Review and received a Louis Sudler Prize in the Arts. He is a widely published writer and recipient of a 1991 Georgia Council for the Arts individual artist grant in poetry as well as an arts patron and collector of American art. Webb has been honored for his community work by Georgia Trend Magazine, which named him to their annual "Top 40 under 40" list in 2005, and by the Atlanta Falcons, which cited him as a "Community Quarterback" in 2006. Webb is an executive at Mohawk Industries, a Fortune 500 flooring manufacturer, and is a three-time chair of the Creative Arts Guild's board of directors. Webb continues to curate the garden, seeking work from artists, galleries and auction houses. The garden's logo features Webb's signature, rendered as his initials.

== Accolades and Media Coverage ==
On October 6, 2015, Robert Webb was honored by Governor Nathan Deal of Georgia as one of the recipients of the annual Governor's Awards for the Arts and Humanities at the state capitol in Atlanta.

On November 13, 2017, travel writer for The Atlanta Journal-Constitution Mary Caldwell listed the Robert T. Webb Sculpture Garden as the only Georgia location among her "6 amazing outdoor sculpture destinations in the South." Other sites listed were in Louisiana, Mississippi, Tennessee, Alabama and South Carolina.

In the July 2018 issue of Georgia Magazine, writer Kathy Witt highlighted the Robert T. Webb Sculpture Garden as one of three locations in the state that "connect people with nature, art and one another."

In an October 17, 2020, editorial, the Dalton Daily Citizen encouraged area residents to visit the Robert T. Webb Sculpture Garden due to significant additions to the collection and the relative safety afforded to visitors in outdoor venues with social distancing during the pandemic.

== Key works ==
Webb has stated that the sculpture garden's works were selected to showcase different sculptural forms—carving, casting, assembling and modeling—as well as to create a dialogue between the works. In each section of the garden, key monumental works serve as "anchors" to reinforce the spaces. In the more expansive "Ken and Myra White Magnolia Crescent," William Wareham's Duende, Guy Dill's Spreader, Caroline Ramersdorfer's Inner View Deeper, Jim Wolfe's Wm. Tell and Kyle Van Lusk's Fallen define the space. The Founder's Garden space is defined by Ken Macklin's Simoon, Don Lawler's Seedling and Robert Willms' Trojan Taurus. Inner View Deeper and Seedling illustrate the art of stone carving. Both works are hand carved by the artists using traditional as well as power tools. The other key works in these sections are created by welding steel. 3"/>

== Future ==
The sculpture garden continues to focus on outreach to non-traditional audiences. The property, with no gates or barriers, is available to the community from dawn to dusk year round and offers Guide by Cell-based narration to cell-phone users. The Guild's website now features videos of many of the sculptures as a means of providing an engaging virtual experience for three-dimensional artwork. Additional works will become a part of the garden in the years ahead, with a constant goal of maintaining the intimacy of the viewers' experience and successfully integrating new work into the existing collection.

== Works permanently sited at the Sculpture Garden ==
Ken & Myra White Magnolia Crescent

- Spreader (Guy Dill, 1995)
- Reflection (Felipe Castaneda, 1990)
- Garden Shovel (Denice Bizot, 2015)
- Maquette for Ode IV (James Rosati, 1980–82)
- Sea Ribbons (John Richen, 1986)
- O Positive (Michelle Goldstrom-Lanning, 2001)
- Fallen (Kyle Van Lusk, 2010)
- Domaine (John Henry, 1994)
- Untitled (Carl Billingsley, 2002)
- Eté (Gwen Marcus, 1995)
- Honky Tonk (Ryan McCourt, 1999)
- Blue Slide (Royden Mills, 1990-2005)
- Axe (Frank Morbillo, 2008)
- Wm. Tell (James Wolfe, 1990)
- Spartan (Troy Pillow, 2009)
- Rambler (Kevin Shunn, 2002)
- Sleight of Stature (Robert Willms, 2009-2012)
- Untitled (Red) (Betty Gold, 1980s)
- Inner View Deeper (Caroline Ramersdorfer, 2006-2007)
- Untitled (for Dalton) (Jordan Phelps, 2007)
- On Tempo (Judith Steinberg, 2003)
- Saturday Strut (Judith Steinberg, 2003)
- Opening the Shut (Judith Steinberg, 2003)
- Duendé (William Wareham, 2003)
- Two By (Version 3) (Robert Winkler, 2010)

Eli Rosen Garden

- Pollen Keeper II (Melanie Yazzie, 2004)
- Strength from Within (Melanie Yazzie, 2004)
- Mrs. Carter (Chris Beck, 2009)
- Warming Up (Victor Manuel Villarreal, 1985)
- Two Swans (Don Frost, 2019)
- Mr. Wrinkle's Favorite Speedwagon (Verina Baxter, 2009)
- Split Circle (Troy Pillow, 2008)
- Two Part Chair (Scott Burton, 1986)
- Les Trois Soeurs (Vladimir Montúfar, 1998)
- Field Labrador (Chana Orloff, 1960s)

Founders Garden

- Simoon (Ken Macklin, 1992)
- Roots (Michael Little, 2002)
- Affirmation (Jan Chenoweth, 2009)
- Seedling (Don Lawler, 2003-2004)
- Ritual Totem (Aimee Mattila, 2002)
- Octetra (Isamu Noguchi, 1986)
- Sun Drop (Davis Whitfield IV, 2012)
- Double Meta Box 4 (Gerald DiGuisto, 1972)
- Cut Buckle (Robert Willms, 2004)
- Standing Grove in Blues and Greens (Susan Rankin, 2020)
- First Born (Victor Salmones, 1970s)
- Narcissus (Teresa Wells MRSS, 2018)
- Reclining Nude (Ulises Jimenez Obregon, 2008)
- Untitled (Richard Lieberman, 1960s)
- Untitled (Jesus Tellosa, 1980s)
- Trojan Taurus (Robert Willms, 2006-2013)
- Que Sera Sera (Robert Willms, 2010)
- Quien Sera Sera (Robert Willms, 2011)
- Donde Sera Sera (Robert Willms, 2012)
