= Edmonton Contemporary Artists' Society =

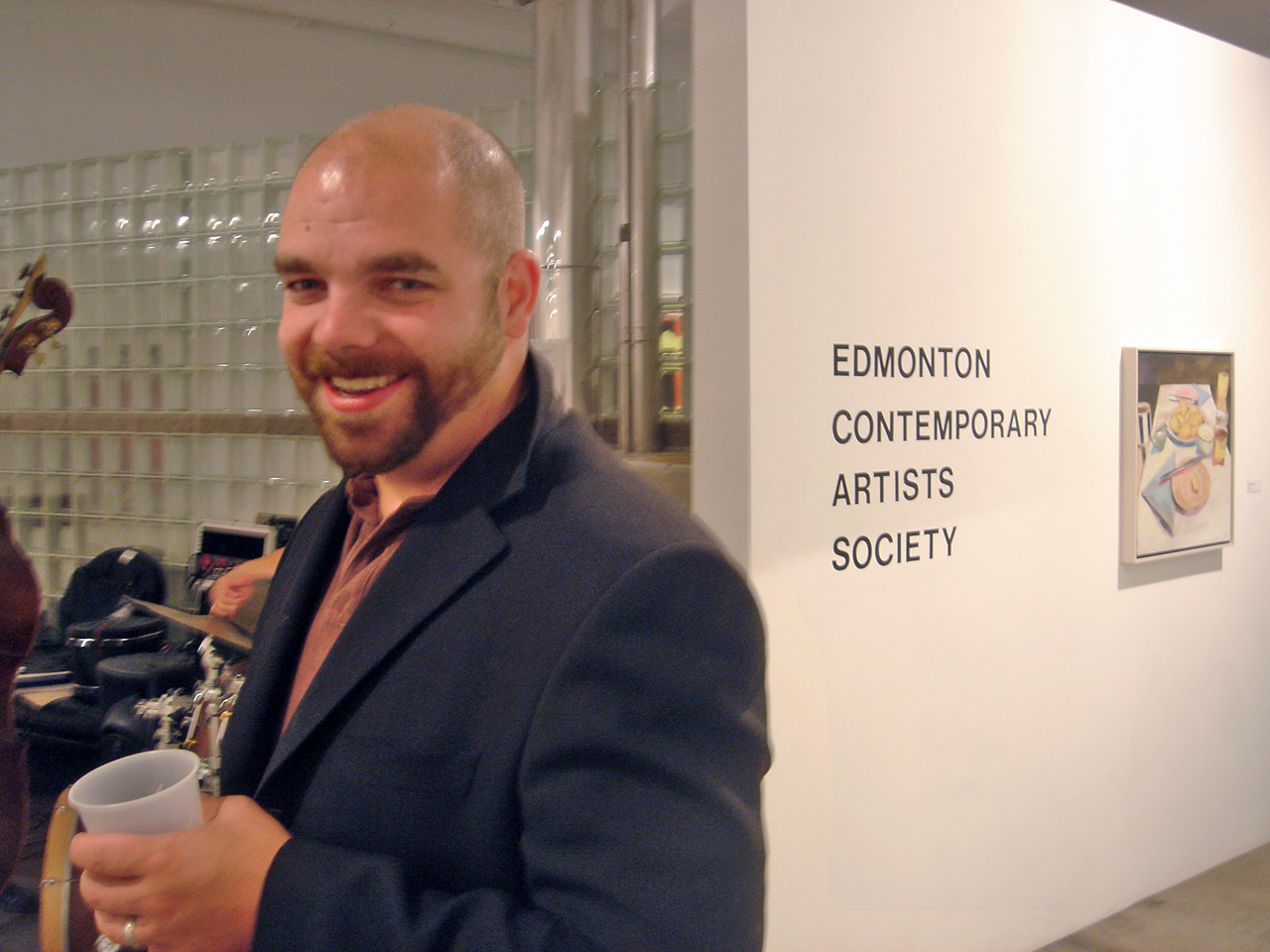
Artist Mark Bellows at the Edmonton Contemporary Artists' Society's 15th Annual Exhibition, 2007.

Edmonton Contemporary Artists' Society (ECAS) is an international artists' exhibition collective founded in 1993, based in Edmonton, Alberta, Canada.

== Background ==
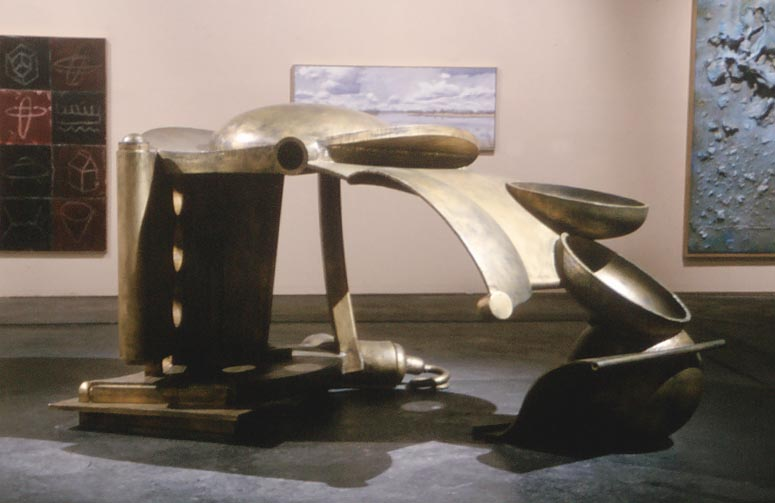
Edmonton Contemporary Artists' Society's 9th Annual Exhibition, 2001

Since the 1920s, artists in English Canada had been heavily influenced by the landscape painting of the Group of Seven, the Canadian Group of Painters and the Eastern Group of Painters. In Quebec, John Goodwin Lyman founded The Contemporary Arts Society in 1939, promoting post-impressionist and fauvist art. Paul-Émile Borduas and Jean-Paul Riopelle spearheaded the modernist collective known as Les Automatistes, which began having exhibitions as early as 1941. However, their artistic influence was not quickly felt in English Canada, or indeed much beyond Montreal. The Painters Eleven (1953 - 1960) was founded in Toronto to promote their members' abstract works. Regina Five is the name given to five abstract painters, Kenneth Lochhead, Arthur McKay, Douglas Morton, Ted Godwin, and Ronald Bloore, who displayed their works in the 1961 National Gallery of Canada's exhibition "Five Painters from Regina". Though not an organized group per se, the name stuck with the 'members' and the artists would continue to show together.

== ECAS ==
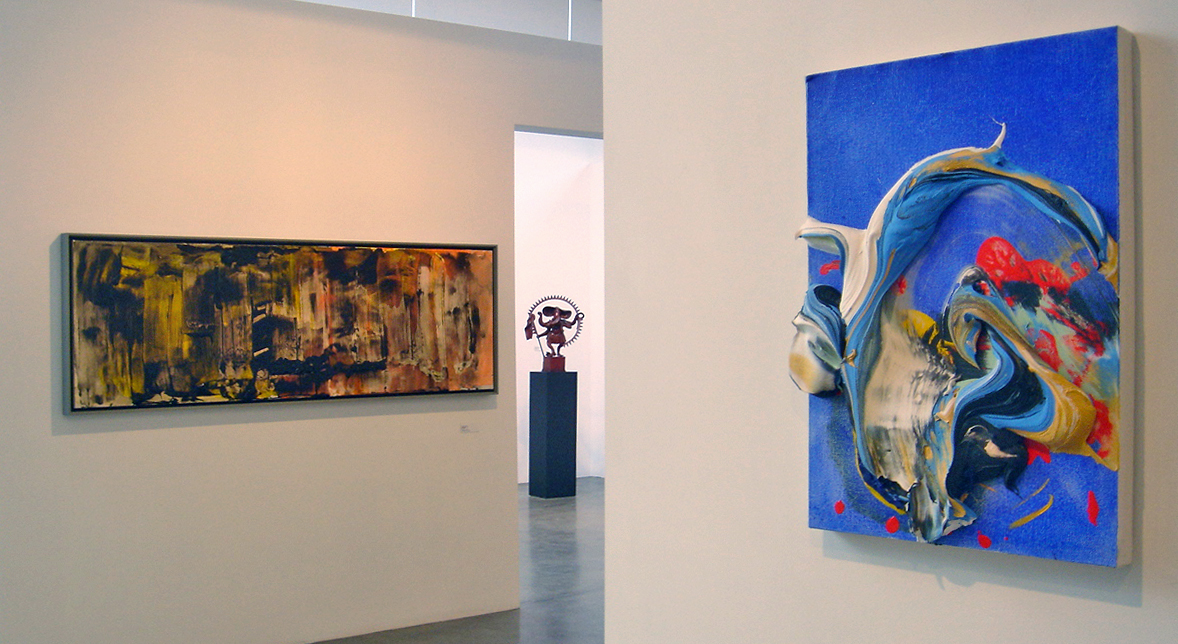
Edmonton Contemporary Artists' Society's 15th Annual Exhibition, 2007

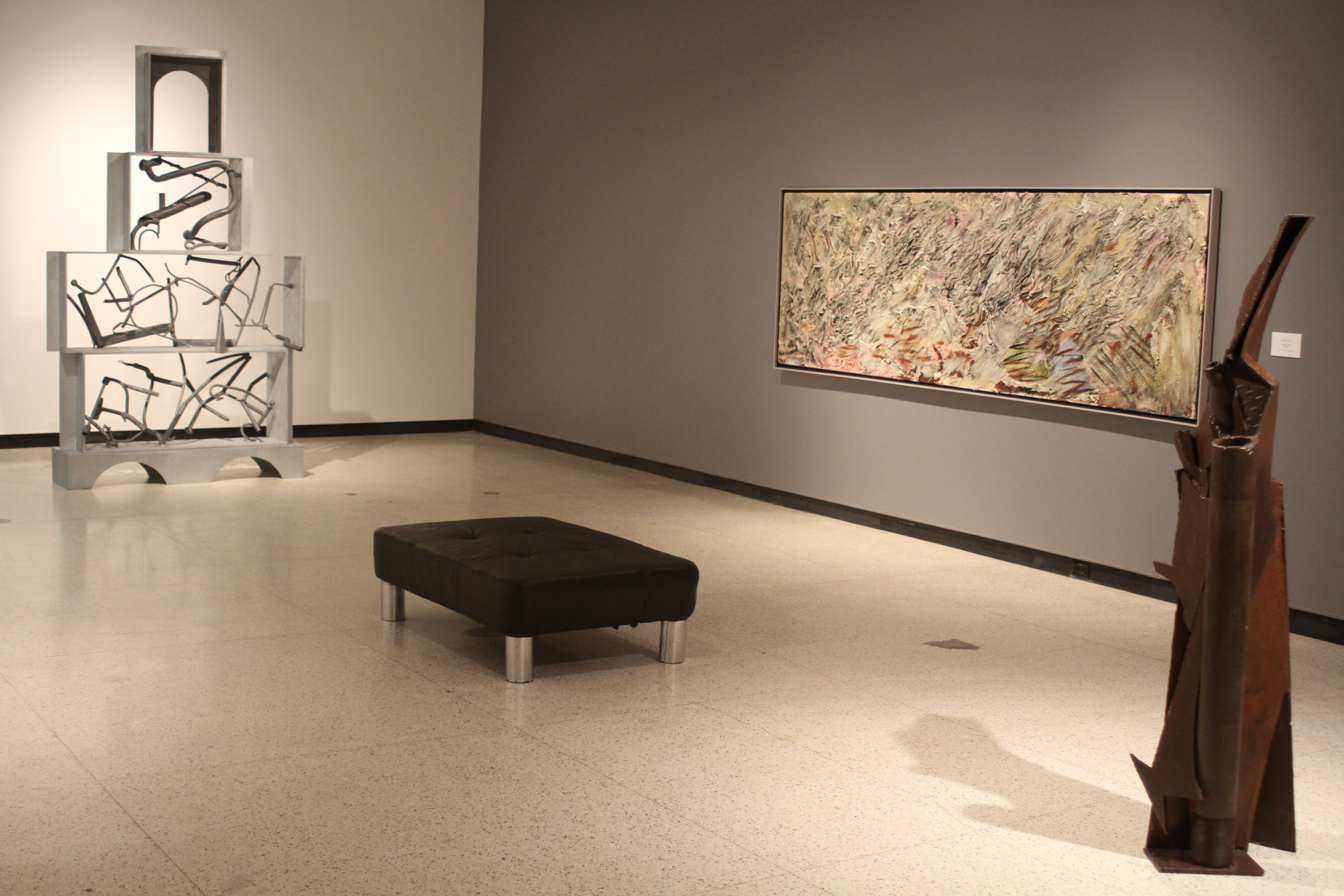
Edmonton Contemporary Artists' Society's 20th Annual Exhibition, 2013

The Edmonton Contemporary Artists' Society was formed in 1993 by a group of abstract artists working in Edmonton, Alberta. Founding artists include sculptor Peter Hide and painters, Terrence Keller, Robert Scott, Mitchel Smith and Graham Peacock. The group formed in order that contemporary art in Edmonton would be seen annually in light of a decline in possibility for exposure by the City and Provincial galleries. The inaugural ECAS exhibition was held at the City Centre Building in Edmonton. ECAS formerly published a newsletter which featured "an interview with an artist, critic or collector" in each issue, including such notable figures such as Clement Greenberg. The society's 15th annual show, in 2007, was hailed as one of their most diverse and successful exhibitions.

== Artists ==
Membership in ECAS is dynamic: some artists have left, and new artists have joined. ECAS includes artists from within Edmonton, as well as locations beyond in Canada, the US, England, and Germany. Some of the artists who have exhibited with ECAS in its history include: César Alvarez, Walter Darby Bannard, Douglas Bentham, Russell Bingham, Hendrik Bres, Anthony Caro, Nola Cassady, Brenda Christiansen, Robert Christie, Ann Clarke, Scott Cumberland, James Davies, Dick Der, Michèle Drouin, Bruce Dunbar, Edward Epp, Gerald Faulder, Terry Fenton, John Griefen, Peter Hide, Bernard Hippel, Terrence Keller, Bianca Khan, John King, John Link, Sheila Luck, Kara Nina Maehler, Ruby J. Mah, Linda Maines, Ryan McCourt, Amanda McRoberts, Lelde Muehlenbachs, Seka Owen, Violet Owen, Dennis J. Panylyk, Graham Peacock, Hilary Prince, Robert A. Scott, Shawn Serfas, Katherine Sicotte, Sasha Silverstein, Mitchel Smith, Libby Weir, Robert Willms.
