= Peter Hide =

English-born abstract sculptor

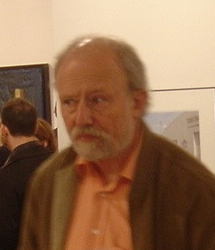
- Born: 1944 (age 81–82); Carshalton, Surrey, UK
- Education: Croydon College of Art, Saint Martin's School of Art
- Known for: Sculpture
- Notable work: "Oddball", "The Conquest of Happiness"
- Movement: Modern art

Peter Nicholas Hide (born 15 December 1944, in Carshalton, Surrey) is an English born abstract sculptor. A one-time pupil of Sir Anthony Caro, Hide is best known for upright, large-scale welded sculptures made of heavy, rusted industrial scrap steel.

Peter Hide works in the Modernist assembled sculpture tradition begun by Pablo Picasso and continued by David Smith and Anthony Caro, but with an emphasis on weight and pressure unlike his artistic forebears. Like his mentor Caro, Hide's sculptures forsake the plinth, but against Caro's open weightlessness, Hide reclaims mass and the monolith, connecting his work to inspirational sources in Auguste Rodin and Brâncuși. "I think a lot of sculptors," Hide says, "especially those who were taught by Tony Caro, decided deliberately to move as far away as possible so as not to be seen as his disciples. The problem is that if you do that you move away from extremely fertile territory.

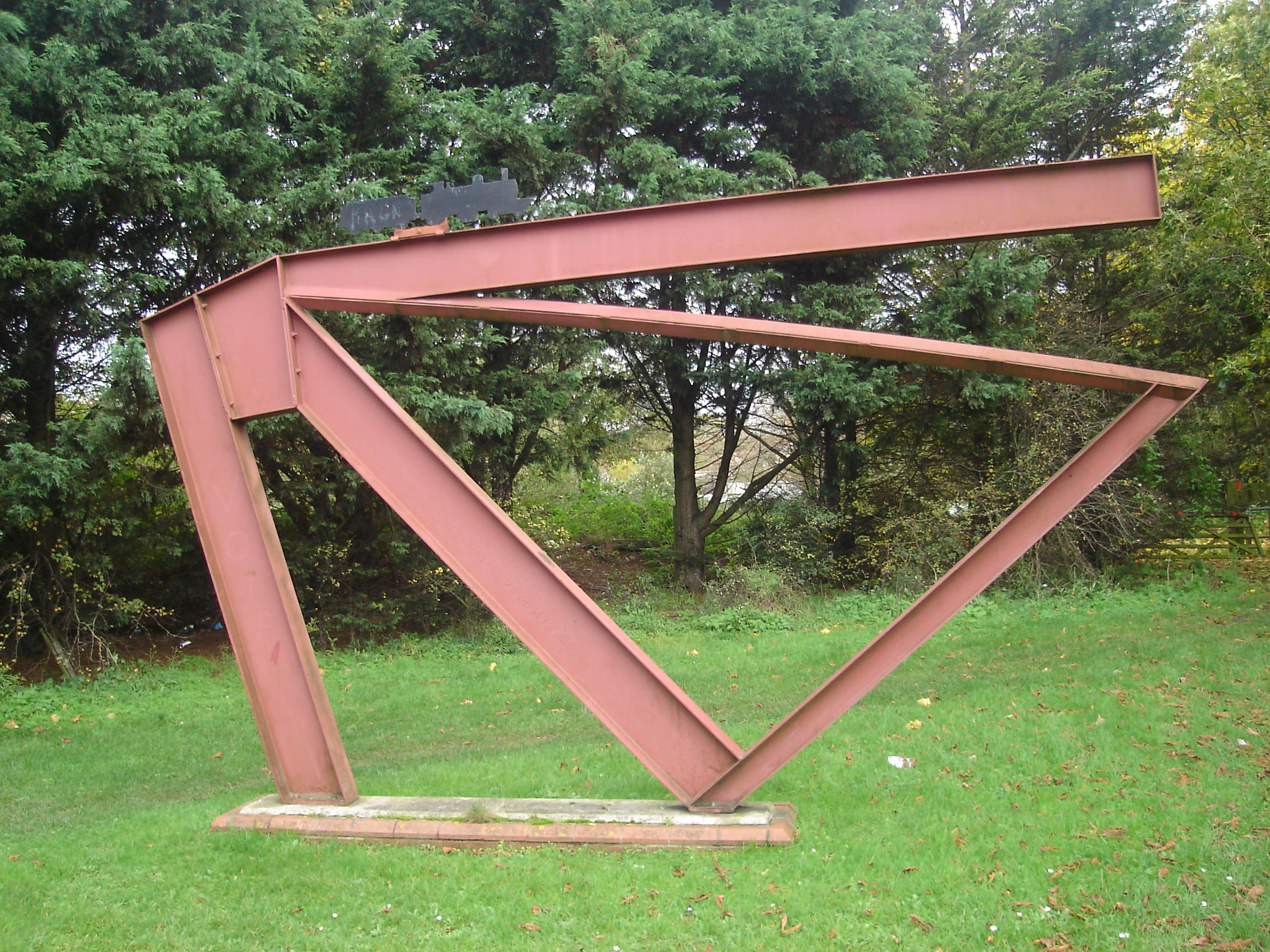
Girder Structure, by Peter Hide, 1978.

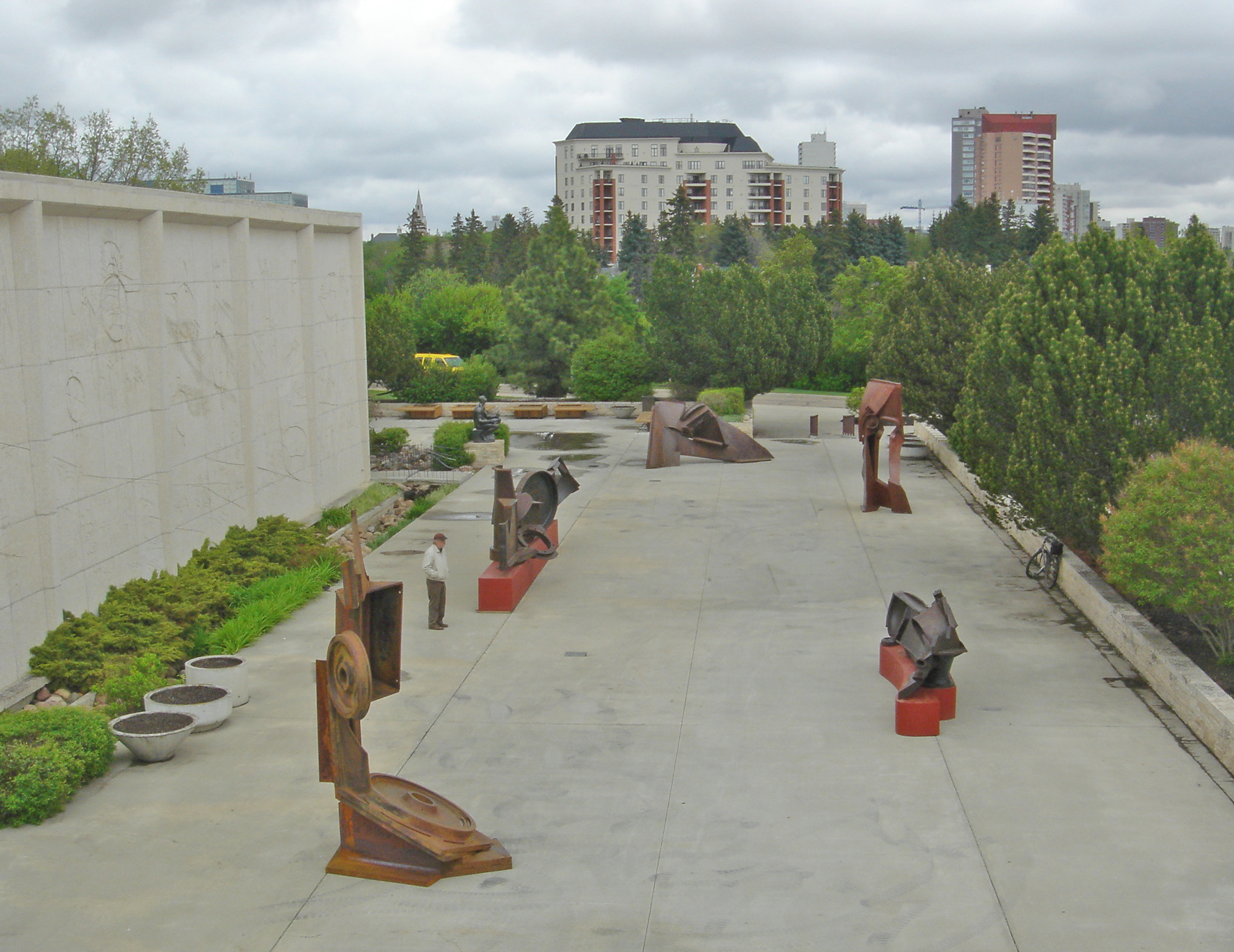
The artist views his installation of "Peter Hide @ The RAM," a 2008 exhibition at the Royal Alberta Museum.

== Early life ==
Peter Hide was born to Gordon Walter Hide and Clarice Marna Ashcroft in 1944, the first of their four children. For two years, Hide attended Wallington Independent Grammar School, and in 1960 began a course in market gardening, with plans to attend horticultural college. A year later, Hide gave up his gardening course, and enrolled full-time as a student at Croydon College of Art. From 1964 to 1967, Hide studied sculpture under Anthony Caro at St. Martin's School of Art, and attracted the attention of the critic Clement Greenberg. After studying with Caro, and working part-time for him as an assistant, Hide set up studio at Stockwell Depot in 1967, where he went on to organise a series of important exhibitions throughout the 70s, sponsored by the Arts Council of Great Britain. From 1971 to 1978, Hide taught sculpture at Saint Martin's.

== Hide in Canada ==
Accepting an invitation from Douglas Haynes to teach at the University of Alberta in 1977, Hide decided to move far from the London art scene, to the frontier Canadian prairie city of Edmonton, giving him the freedom to develop his work on his own terms. Hide was active throughout the 1980s, exhibiting internationally and working at the early Triangle Artists' Workshops. According to a letter from 1983, Clement Greenberg thought Hide "one of the three or four best sculptors working anywhere right now. Among British sculptors, I'd place him second only to Anthony Caro, and to no one in North America."

In 1993, along with the painter Terrence Keller, Peter Hide founded the Edmonton Contemporary Artists' Society. In 1998, the Edmonton Art Gallery held a 25-year retrospective of his work, "Peter Hide in Context." Hide exhibited sculptures in all four of the Royal Alberta Museum's outdoor Big Things exhibitions, and in 2008, the North Edmonton Sculpture Workshop organised a special exhibition of five large works by Hide on the sculpture terrace at the Royal Alberta Museum, "Peter Hide @ The RAM".

Hide currently makes his home in Edmonton, Alberta, where he is married to painter Hilary Prince, and teaches as Professor and Head of the Sculpture Department at the University of Alberta. Peter Hide's art is represented in many important private and public collections throughout North America and Europe, including London's Tate Gallery. Some of Hide's students from the University of Alberta have gone on to work in the medium of welded steel sculpture with a 21st-century post-postmodernist aesthetic sensibility. These artists include Andrew French, Andrew Hellmund, Linda Maines, Ryan McCourt, Royden Mills, Robert Willms, and Tanya Wood.
