= Gwen Marcus (sculptor) =

American sculptor

Gwen Marcus (born 1957) is an American representational sculptor who works primarily in bronze. She is a Fellow of the National Sculpture Society.

== Early life ==
Marcus began exhibiting her artwork at the age of nine, in 1966. She attended New York University, the Rhode Island School of Design and Art Students League, National Academy of Design.

== Collections ==
Her works are held in the collections of Boston Children’s Hospital, Brookgreen Gardens, Champs Hill, England, the Chimei Museum (Taiwan), Cape Cod Museum of Art, Long Island Museum of American Art, Firebirds Baseball Field, Braves Baseball Field, Monument Vice Admiral Colin J. Kilrain USN/SEAL Town Hall Braintree, MA , Osterville Baptist Church, Osterville, MA and Stamford Hospital.

== Awards ==
She has received the following awards:

Gold Medal of Honor, Audubon Artist, Inc Gold Medal, Hudson Valley Art Association Gold Medal of Honor and the American Professional League, Gold Medal of Honor.

2021 - Frank C. Wright Medal of Honor, The American Artists Professional League, New York
