= Octetra =

Sculpture by Isamu Noguchi

- Artist: Isamu Noguchi
- Year: 1968
- Medium: concrete
- Dimensions: 330 cm × 290 cm (113 ½ in × 128 in × 113 in)

Octetra is a concrete sculpture by Isamu Noguchi, from 1968.

== Description ==
It is an abstract painted concrete sculpture. It was designed to be a play structure.

== History ==
It was first exhibited near Spoleto Cathedral

There are examples at Robert T. Webb Sculpture Garden, Takamatsu Japan, Moerenuma Park.

It was shown at the Pace Gallery.
