= Lylian Klimek =

Canadian artist and educator (born 1942)

- Born: 1942 (age 83–84); Humboldt, Saskatchewan, Canada
- Education: University of Alberta
- Style: sculpture

Lylian Klimek (born 1942) is a Canadian artist and educator.

She was born in Humboldt, Saskatchewan. Klimek received a BFA in sculpture, a master's degree in sociology and a Master of Visual Arts in sculpture from the University of Alberta. She has taught sculpture at the Alberta College of Art and Design. She has participated in several group shows including Woman as Viewer at the Winnipeg Art Gallery and has had solo exhibitions at galleries in Edmonton. In her sculptures, she has experimented with various media including fibreglass, concrete, paper pulp and wood; she also experiments with various forming techniques. She lives and works in Calgary.

Her sculptures and installations explore man's interaction with nature. Her work is included in the collections of the Alberta Foundation for the Arts, the University of Alberta and Government House in Edmonton.
