= Osterville Baptist Church =

Historic church in Massachusetts, United States

- U.S. National Register of Historic Places
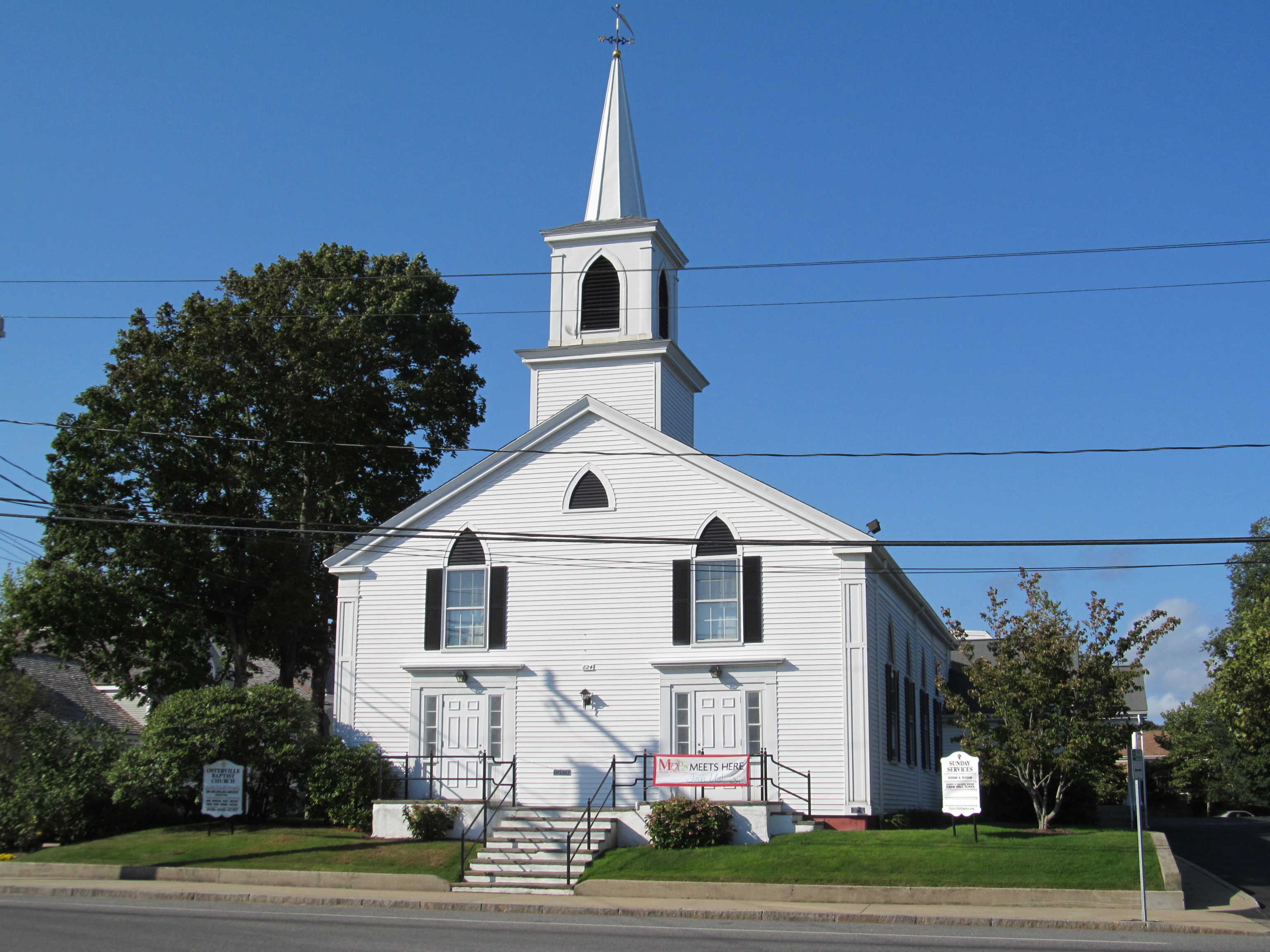
- Osterville Baptist Church

- Location within Cape Cod Location within Massachusetts Location within the United States
- Location: Barnstable, Massachusetts
- Coordinates: 41°37′41″N 70°23′9″W
- Built: 1837
- Architect: Deyo, Simeon
- Architectural style: Greek Revival, Gothic Revival
- MPS: Barnstable MRA
- NRHP reference No.: 87000292
- Added to NRHP: September 18, 1987

The Osterville Baptist Church is an historic Baptist church building at 824 Main Street in the Osterville village of Barnstable, Massachusetts. The white clapboarded wood-frame structure was built in 1837 for a congregation formed two years earlier. It is one of the older buildings in Osterville, and is a fine example of the Greek Revival with Gothic Revival elements. The church was listed on the National Register of Historic Places in 1987.

== Description and history ==
The Osterville Baptist Church is set prominently in the center of Osterville on the north side of the junction of Main Street and Wianno Avenue. It is a rectangular single-story wood-frame structure, with a gable roof, vinyl siding, and a brick foundation. Its exterior features a mix of Greek Revival and Gothic Revival styling, with corner paneled pilasters rising to entablatures running along the sides of the building, and lancet-arched panels above its windows. Its facade is symmetrically arranged, with a pair of entrances, each framed by sidelight windows and pilasters, with an entablature and cornice on top, and sash windows above. A single lancet-arch panel adorns the center of the gable end. The church has a two-stage square tower, with a plain first stage topped by a belfry with lancet-arched louvered openings, and a steeple above.

The church congregation was organized in 1835 as the Second Barnstable Baptist Church, and this church was dedicated in 1838, having been built on land given by Captain George Lovell. Its steeple is a reconstruction of the original, which was lost in a hurricane in 1945. The church interior was remodeled in 1889, at which time a heating system was added. Further additions have been made to the rear of the building, adding classroom, meeting, and office spaces.

== See also ==
- National Register of Historic Places listings in Barnstable, Massachusetts
