= The Works Art & Design Festival =

Art festival in Edmonton, Canada

The Works Art & Design Festival logo

The Works Art & Design Festival is a thirteen-day festival held at the end of June and the beginning of July in downtown Edmonton, Alberta, Canada. The festival displays the work of artists and designers from across Canada as well as exhibits from international presenters.

== Overview ==
The festival is held in downtown Edmonton. It was first held in 1986. It has over 372,000 attendees. It presents free art exhibits in over 30 venues around Edmonton's centre, such as restaurants, vacant retail spaces, warehouses, city parks, and office building lobbies. Since 2021, the main site is Sir Winston Churchill Square.

== Programming ==
The festival exhibits the work of well-known and emerging artists. Any artist or designer may apply to participate in the festival, or may be invited by the festival. The majority of the content is Canadian. In 2009, The Works launched The Works Canadian Aboriginal Artist Program, which features art from aboriginal artists. The "Works With Jazz" Program is a collaboration between The Works Art & Design Festival and The Edmonton Jazz Festival. It features jazz and art performances.

== See also ==
- Festivals in Alberta
