= Ken Macklin =

Canadian artist (born 1952)

- Born: 1952 (age 73–74); Edmonton, Alberta
- Education: University of Alberta, Banff School of Fine Arts, Emma Lake Artists' Workshops, Saint Martin's School of Art
- Known for: sculptor
- Notable work: Simoon
- Movement: abstract art, modernism, cubism
- Patrons: Robert T. Webb Sculpture Garden

Ken Macklin (born 1952) is a Canadian artist best known for his large abstract sculptures made from industrial materials.

== Biography ==
Kenneth John Macklin was born in Edmonton, Alberta. From 1972 - 1978, Macklin studied sculpture and ceramics at the University of Alberta. In 1979 Macklin travelled to England to study advanced sculpture at St. Martin's School of Art in London. A professional artist since 1980, Macklin has participated in a number of artists workshops including the Triangle Workshops in New York and Barcelona, and the Emma Lake Artists' Workshops in Saskatchewan. Ken Macklin's sculptures can be found in the civic art collections of St. Albert, Edmonton and Calgary; at the Catalunya Institute of Contemporary Art, Barcelona; Lehigh Valley Hospital, Pennsylvania; Lock Haven University, Pennsylvania; and the Robert T. Webb Sculpture Garden, Dalton, Georgia.

Ken Macklin's sculptures have been praised by a number of critics. Clement Greenberg reportedly hailed his large steel sculpture "Simoon" a "masterpiece". According to Terry Fenton, "Macklin's extraordinary ability to build overall configurations from side-by-side attachments may account for both his poetry and mastery of scale."

Ken Macklin lives and works in Gunn, Alberta.
