= Robert Willms =

Canadian sculptor and teacher (born 1969)

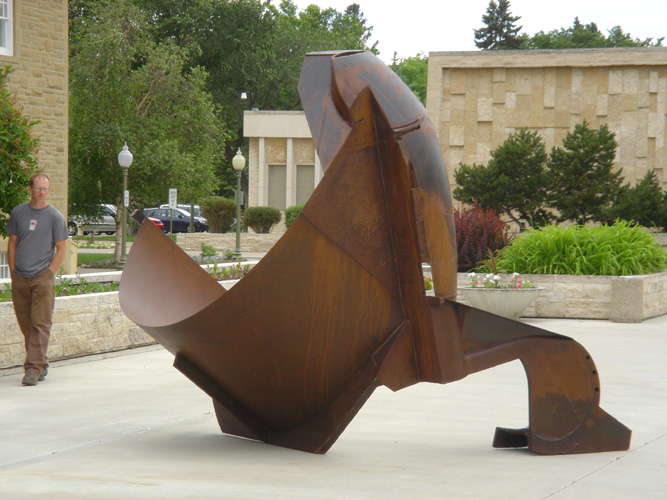
- Robert Willms views his sculpture "Plowshares and Pruninghooks" at the Royal Alberta Museum's Alberta Centennial Sculpture Exhibition in 2005
- Born: Robert Byron Willms; 1969 (age 56–57); Abbotsford, British Columbia, Canada
- Education: University of Alberta, Edmonton, North American Baptist College, Edmonton, Kamloops Senior Secondary School, Kamloops
- Known for: Sculptor, graphic artist
- Movement: Constructed steel sculpture, abstract art, modernism
- Patrons: Robert T. Webb Sculpture Garden

Robert Byron Willms (born 1969) is a Canadian sculptor and teacher, best known for creating assembled, abstract steel sculptures.

== Biography ==
Willms was born in Abbotsford, British Columbia, in 1969 and resides in Edmonton, Alberta. He has lived in Fort St. John, Dawson Creek, Grande Prairie, and Kamloops, which he considers his hometown. Robert's father, John Willms, while working as a welder, encouraged his son to consider the ironworking trade, but Robert initially disliked the idea of such work. At eighteen years old, Willms was injured in a motorcycle accident, resulting in a below-knee amputation of one leg. Ever adaptable, Willms defied this disability as an avid snowboarder and cyclist.

Willms' interest in making art began with pencil drawings, copying pictures of famous paintings out of art books, and lead to his earning Associate of Arts and Bachelor of Arts degrees. This formal education ironically left Willms feeling "disillusioned with the arts completely". Willms married, and had two children. A visit to the steel sculpture studio of Peter Hide reignited Willms' interest in art. Hide took Willms on, initially as an exhibition preparation volunteer, then as a studio assistant, and eventually as a Master of Fine Arts student at the University of Alberta. During his time at the school, Willms co-founded the Society of Student Artists (SoSA), now known as the University of Alberta Visual Arts Student Association (VASA). After leaving university, Willms joined the North Edmonton Sculpture Workshop (NESW). Willms is a member of the Edmonton Contemporary Artists' Society (ECAS).

== Work ==
Willms works in the Modernist assembled sculpture tradition begun by Julio González and Pablo Picasso, and continued by David Smith, Anthony Caro, and Willms' mentor, Peter Hide, using solid and sheet steel forms to create heavy, convoluted abstract sculptures. Art critic Piri Halasz has written, in reference to international contemporary sculpture, "As far as that goes, New York also has no equal to Hide, nor to such up-and-comers as Willms...". Robert Willms himself has stated, "No declaration regarding my artwork will withstand scrutiny when compared against the work itself, and little that I say about myself can be surely trusted. Words lack. I am unable to adequately explain how it is that one sculpture looks better than another. Neither can I foretell how good the next one might be. I nevertheless aspire, beholden by the greatest examples of art, to the creation of my own good work – a life’s work that will last because it’s too good to toss out." Six of Willms' sculptures are featured in the Robert T. Webb Sculpture Garden; the largest representation of works by any one artist within the collection. Trojan Taurus is listed in the "key works" within the "Founders Garden" area of the collection. Willms' sculptures are featured in other public collections, including the Mazankowski Alberta Heart Institute; the Alberta Foundation for the Arts and the University of Alberta.
