= Royal Alberta Museum =

History museum in Edmonton, Alberta

- Logo since 2018

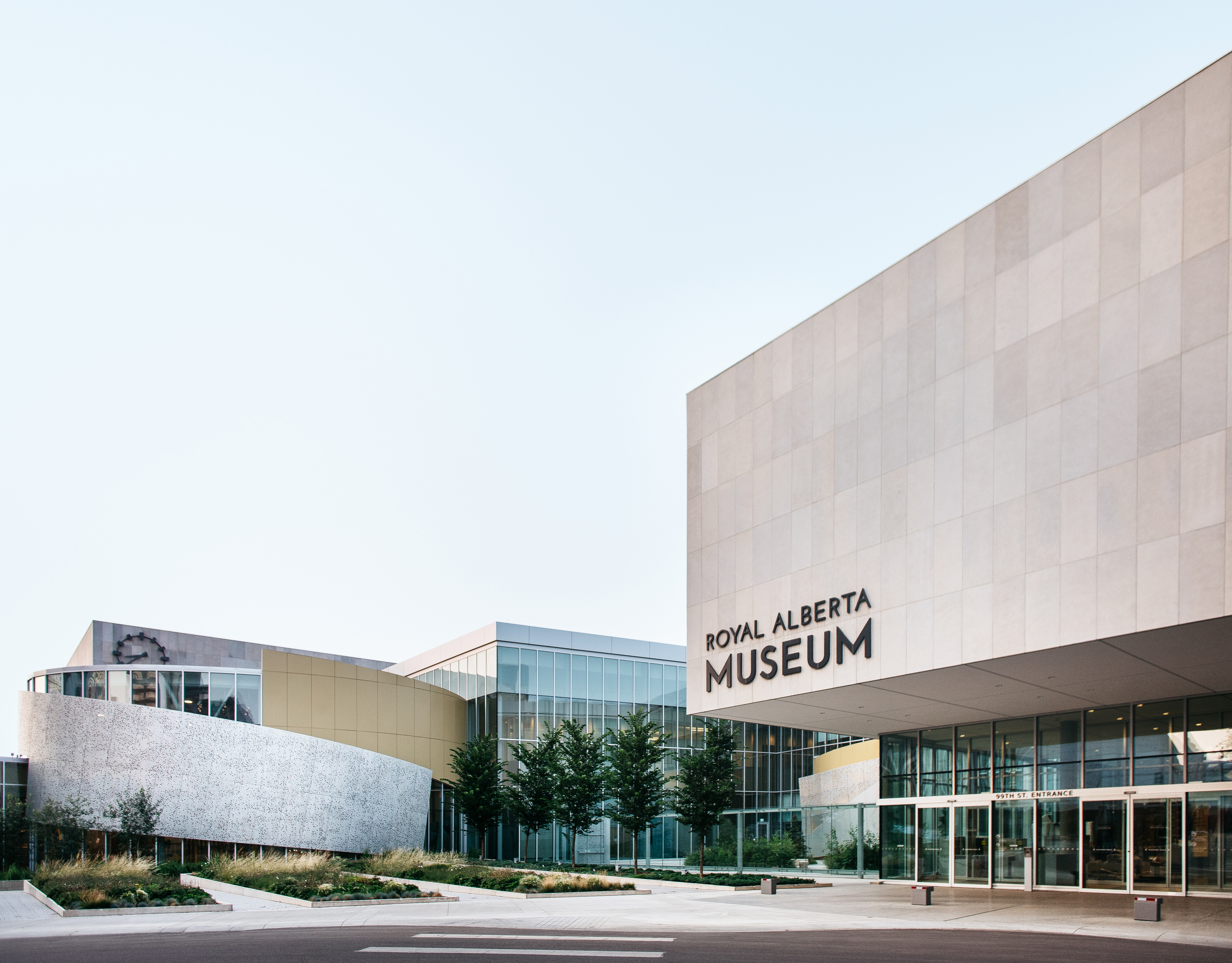
- The Royal Alberta Museum located in downtown Edmonton

- Location in Edmonton
- Former name: Provincial Museum of Alberta (1967-2005)
- Established: December 6, 1967
- Location: Edmonton, Alberta, Canada
- Coordinates: 53.5470651°N 113.48885°W
- Type: Natural history, human history
- Key holdings: Big Things 3
- Collections: Cultural studies, Earth science, life science
- Collection size: >2,000,000
- Visitors: >400,000 (2018-19)
- Director: Meaghan Patterson
- Architects: Raymond O. Harrison (1967); Ledcor, DIALOG (2017)
- Owner: Government of Alberta
- Public transit access: Churchill station
- Website: royalalbertamuseum.ca

The Royal Alberta Museum (RAM) is a museum of human and natural history in Downtown Edmonton, Alberta, Canada, located north of City Hall. The museum is the largest in western Canada with more than 7,600 square metres (82,000 sq ft) exhibition space and 38,900 square metres (419,000 sq ft) in total.

The museum was established by the Government of Alberta in December 1967 as the Provincial Museum of Alberta. The museum received royal patronage from Queen Elizabeth II, and was renamed the Royal Alberta Museum in 2005. In 2011, plans were announced to move the museum to a new building. The museums continued to operate from its original building in Glenora, Edmonton until it was closed to the public in December 2015. Although the museum was closed to the public, a number of its departments continued to operate, either preparing the museum's collection for the move, or conducting fieldwork. The new building was completed in August 2016, and was opened to the public in October 2018.

The museum features expansive galleries chronicling Alberta's natural and cultural worlds, a feature gallery showcasing travelling exhibitions from Canada and around the world, an interactive, 650 square metres (7,000 sq ft) dedicated children's gallery, and a bug room with live invertebrates and visible nursery.

== History ==
The Canadian Federal Government’s Confederation Memorial Centennial Program and the Government of Alberta began planning for a museum in 1950. In 1962, they hired Raymond O. Harrison, an Australian architect who had been involved in the design of the Vancouver Maritime Museum to direct the planned museum. Harrison was given 5 million dollars to house and staff the museum as well as to build the collections.

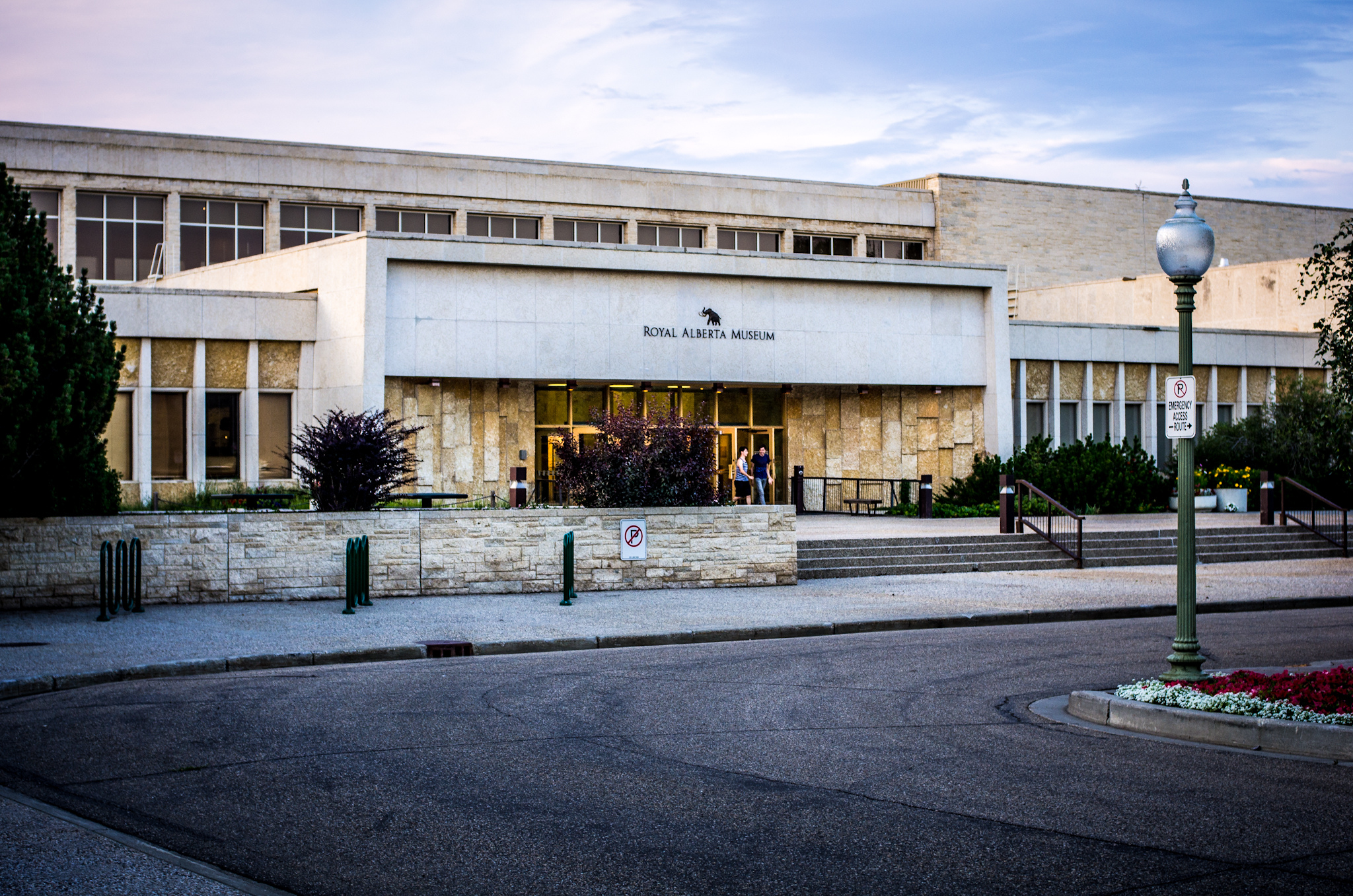
The original Royal Alberta Museum was situated in the neighbourhood of Glenora from 1967 to 2018.

The museum opened to the public December 6, 1967 as the Provincial Museum of Alberta. On opening day, the museum's main floor featured galleries presenting the fur trade; Indigenous Peoples in Alberta; early photographs of Aboriginal people taken by Ernest Brown and Harry Pollard. Second floor galleries were less incomplete, but featured exhibits on agriculture; "pioneer" life; and industry and commerce. The museum expanded through the 1960s and 1970s with more exhibits, curatorial programs and staff. In 1968, new exhibits portraying Alberta's dinosaurs and "Adaptations for Survival" were added to the natural history section, and permanent exhibits of "Vehicles of Alberta's Past", "Uniforms of RCMP Superintendent H. C. Forbes", "R. R. Gonsett, Inventor" and "Early Building in Saskatchewan" were added to the human history section. In 1969, exhibits on volcanos, the thrush family were added to that natural history gallery, and displays of "Domestic Artifacts of Utility", the history of Indigenous peoples (including a display of Blackfoot clothing), and new agricultural artifacts were added to the human history gallery. The same year, a diorama of Pronghorns was created as the first of sixteen planned displays of Alberta's natural habitat.

In the late summer/fall of 1982, the provincial museum's palaeontology program, including many of the program's staff and collection, was split from the museum by the provincial government. The palaeontology program was spun off in order to facilitate the establishment of the Tyrrell Museum of Palaeontology, opened in 1985.

Logo used until 2018

Paid admission began in 1990, and to increase its audience the ground floor Indian Gallery was removed and the space used for feature exhibition space. In 1991, the mammal and bird gallery was upgraded with a display on "Survival and Reproduction", and the following year the "Beauty and Science of Birds" exhibit was built, including three new dioramas and a "Naturalist's Study". A temporary exhibit called "The Bug Room" in the summer of 1992 featured live insects, and it was so successful that the museum decided to bring it back as a larger and permanent component of the museum in 1993. A new permanent "Earth Science Gallery" was partially opened in December 1993, though not fully completed until the following May. Also in 1993, the museum launched the "In All Their Finery" exhibit of aboriginal artifacts as the first phase of the larger "Syncrude Gallery of Aboriginal Culture." The complete Syncrude gallery was inaugurated years later in November 1997. This gallery was later complemented with a large purchase from the family of James Carnegie at a Sotheby's auction on 8 May 2006. The sale of the "James Carnegie Collection" was billed as the most significant auction of North American Indian artifacts to date, including a prized beaded dress collected in 1859 which cost US$497,600.

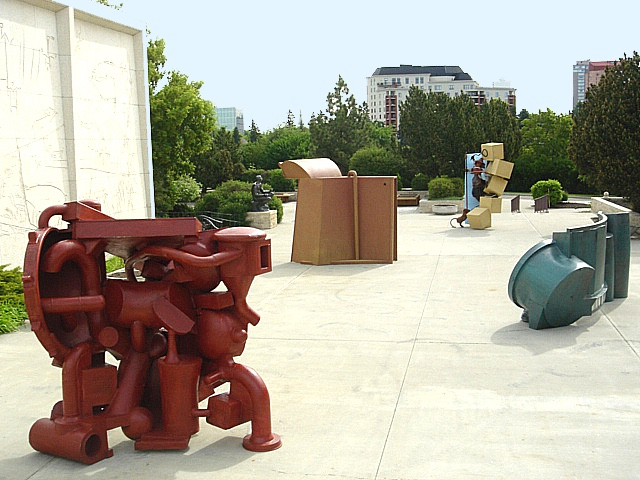
From 2002 to 2006, the museum hosted the North Edmonton Sculpture Workshop's Big Things outdoor sculpture exhibition.

In 2003, the Habitat Gallery was greatly renovated into a new "Wild Alberta" interactive exhibit. From 2002 to 2006, the Royal Alberta Museum hosted the North Edmonton Sculpture Workshop's groundbreaking "Big Things" outdoor sculpture exhibition series on the South Terrace.

In 2005, Alberta's centennial year, the NESW produced the RAM's Alberta Centennial Sculpture Exhibition, and on 24 May 2005, Queen Elizabeth II visited, bestowing royal patronage. On December 6, 2015, the museum closed down 48 years after its opening in 1967 to move to a new location.

=== New building ===
In April 2011, it was announced that a new building for the Royal Alberta Museum would be built in Downtown Edmonton, north of the city hall and Law Courts, and east of the CN Tower, on the land formerly occupied by Canada Post's Edmonton station. The 36,000 m^{2} (390,000 sq ft) building, which contains twice as much gallery space, was estimated to cost $340 million, and was completed in 2015. Premier Stelmach and the Alberta government have said that the location of the new building could be used for the terminal of an Edmonton—Calgary high speed rail line, while the old location will be the site for a new residence for the Lieutenant Governor.

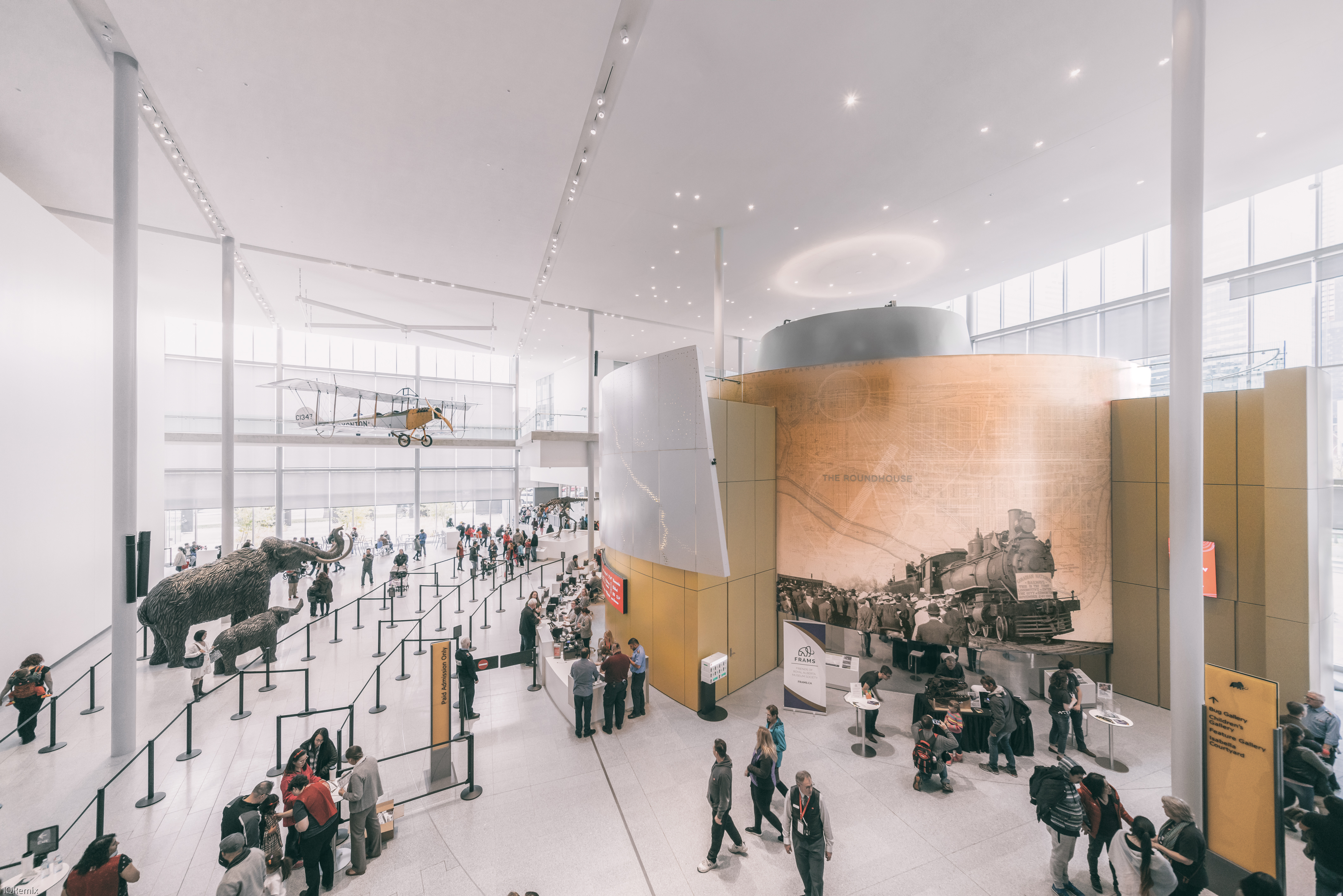
Lobby of the new building several days after opening, October 2018

Construction of the new building was completed on August 16, 2016, and the opening date of October 3, 2018, was announced on September 12, 2018. The new building is the largest museum in western Canada with more than 7,600 square metres (82,000 sq ft) of exhibition space and 38,900 square metres (419,000 sq ft). The museum features expansive galleries chronicling Alberta's natural and cultural worlds, a feature gallery showcasing travelling exhibitions from Canada and around the world, an interactive, 650 square metres (7,000 sq ft) dedicated children's gallery, and a bigger bug room with live invertebrates and visible nursery. The total cost of the new building and moving is estimated around CAD $375.5 million, with $253 million from the Government of Alberta, and $122.5 million from the federal government Building Canada Fund.

== Collection ==
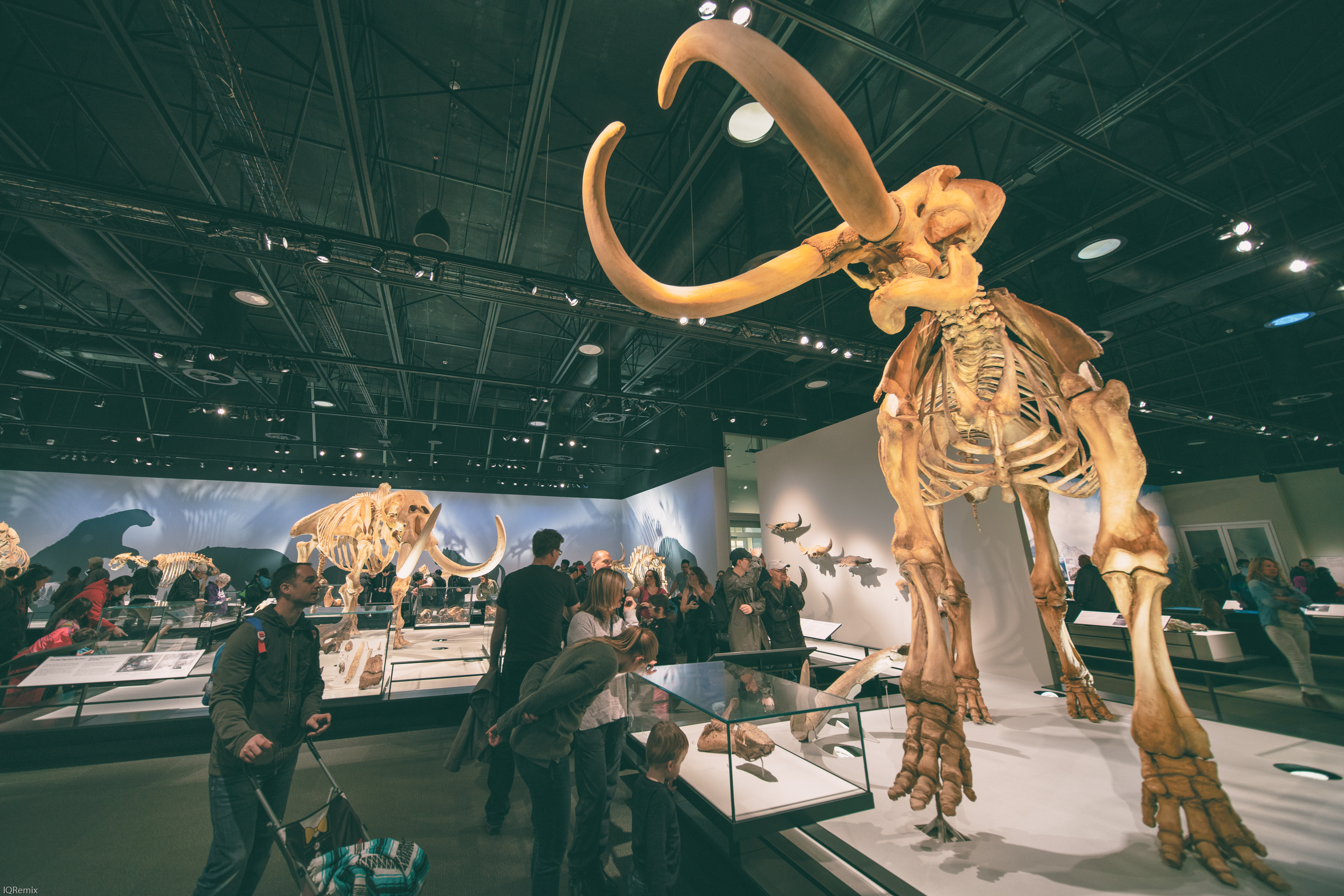
The museum's collection includes several fossils

The collections are divided into four main categories:

- Life Science: Botany, Ichthyology/Herpetology, Invertebrate Zoology, Mammalogy and Ornithology Program – 577,745 objects
- Earth Science: Archaeology, Geology, Quaternary Paleontology, and Quaternary Environments – 9,224,075 objects
- Human History: Ethnology, Cultural Studies (formerly Folk Life), Military and Political History (formerly Government History) and Western Canadian History – 137,610 objects
- Collections Services: Collections Management, Conservation, Information Resource Management, Resource Library – 70,103 objects

Between 1989 and 2001, 175 travelling exhibitions were displayed at the museum. Some of which include: Prehistorics Gigantics (1990), Whales! Bigger than Dinosaurs (1992), Sharks: Facts and Fantasy (1993), Masters of the Night: The True Story of Bats (1994), Carnosaurs! (1995), Bugsworld (1996), Genghis Khan (1997), Syria-Land of Civilizations (2001) and International Wildlife Photographer of the Year (2003).

=== Galleries ===
The following are current galleries operated by the Royal Alberta Museum:

- Natural History hall: This Hall contains a collection of dioramas, fossils, animals and plants that represents Alberta's wildlife. This hall contains four main sections: Ice Age Alberta (plants and animals that lived in Alberta 10000 years ago, with over 34,000 Ice Age fossils in the museum), Ancient Alberta (Alberta's Rocky Mountains formations, diversity of rocks and Edmontosaurus ), Gems and Minerals (meteorites, crystals, colorful minerals, rubies, diamonds, emeralds and minerals and gems from both Canada and around the world), Wild Alberta (animals and plants found in Alberta's three ecological zone and also the wild landscapes).

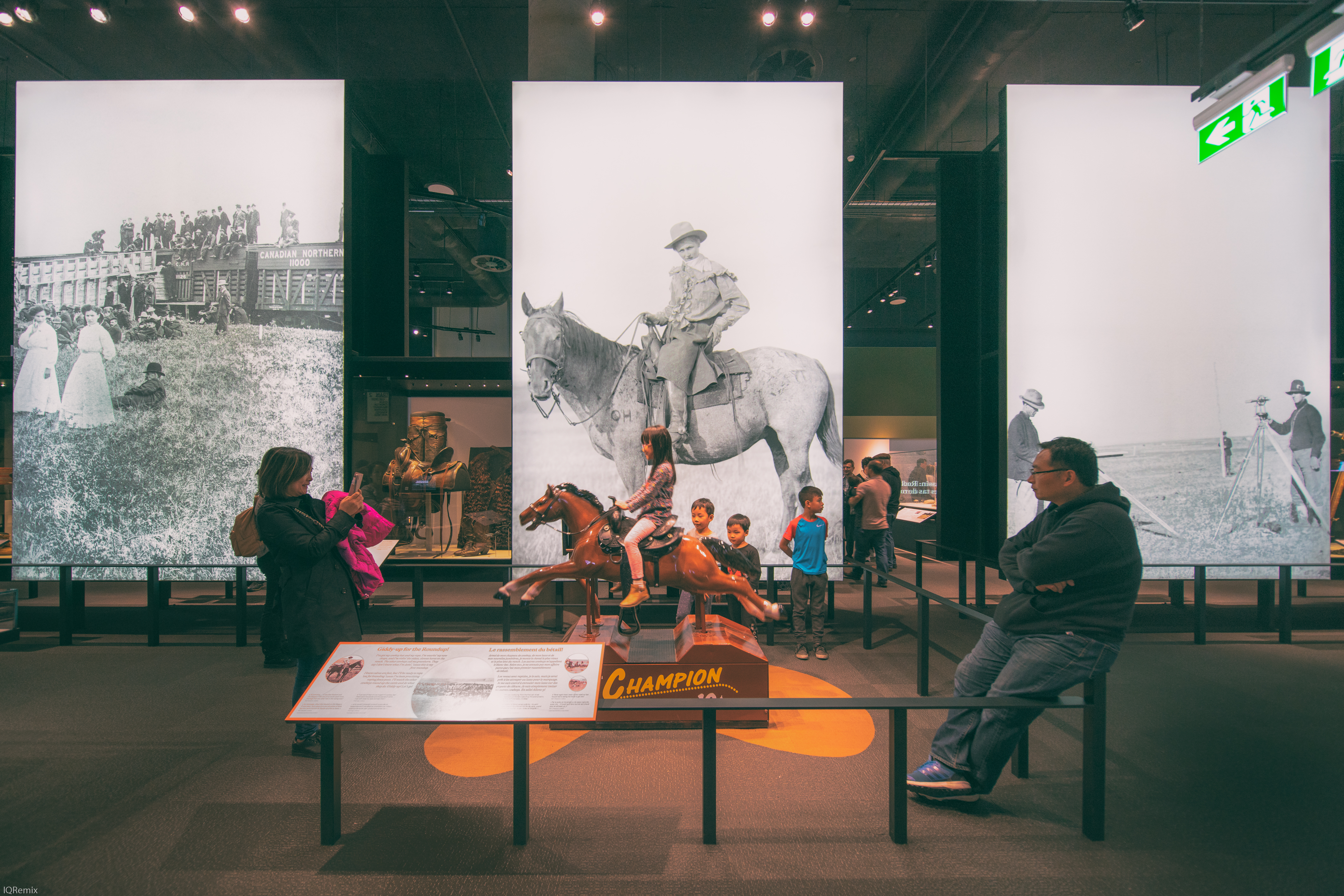
View of the Human History hall, a gallery that showcases the history of Alberta

- Human history hall: This Hall shares the History of Alberta's past and its people. This hall contains six sections which includes: Ancestral Lands (history, lifestyles of indigenous people who have lived in parts of Alberta), Worlds meet (multiple perspectives of cultural and economics exchange between indigenous and European newcomers from 1680 to 1880), After buffalo (stories between 1859 and 1900 about resistance and resilience, suffering and hope in Alberta), Alberta forms (stories from 1880s about Alberta becoming a province, looking into economics, culture, spiritual beliefs and political beliefs), Alberta Transforms (stories in post- 1945 Alberta, oil, population growth, arts archaic attitudes towards healthcare and the awakening of equal rights), What makes us strong (the sharing of knowledge and values of Alberta's various indigenous communities).
- Bug Gallery: This gallery displays insects, spiders and other invertebrates from both Alberta and the world. This galleries contains stories such as: What is an invertebrate, Metamorphosis, Ambush predators, Finding a mate, Reef Conservation, Social Insects, Warning colours, Freshwater Diversity.
- Children Gallery: This gallery is an environment made for younger visitors to engage, play and learn. Containing sections such as Alberta Naturally, Dig pit, Toddler Area, Chautauqua, Makerspace, Community Gallery.
- Feature Gallery: This gallery is a limited time featured Gallery that is displayed for a short period of time
- Changing exhibition: This Gallery display allows visitors to engage in Alberta's history and contemporary stories.

=== Former galleries ===
The following were galleries operated by the Royal Alberta Museum when it was located in Glenora:

- Wild Alberta Gallery: This gallery contained dioramas, which showed Alberta animals in replicated natural habitats. The gallery also gave visitors information on the ecosystems of Alberta and how animals, microorganisms and humans interact in the environment.
- Syncrude Gallery of Aboriginal Culture: This gallery explored the history of North American Aboriginals with over 3000 artifacts spanning 11,000 years of history. It started with the time of the last ice age, and explored aboriginal settlement, livelihood and culture.
- Natural History Gallery: This gallery was home to the popular "Bug Room", where some of the world's largest bugs are on display. The gallery also boasted an area dedicated to the vegetation of Alberta as well as the birds that make Alberta home. The entrance to the gallery housed a large geology exhibit containing gems and rocks, as well as a collection of the rocks that make up the landscape of Alberta.

== See also ==
- List of Canadian organizations with royal patronage
- List of museums in Alberta
