= Alberta Foundation for the Arts =

Agency overview
- Formed: 1972
- Preceding agencies: Foundation for the Performing Arts; Alberta Foundation for the Literary Arts; Alberta Art Foundation
- Jurisdiction: Alberta
- Website: www.affta.ab.ca

Alberta Foundation for the Arts (AFA) is a crown corporation charged with development and promotion of the arts in Alberta, Canada. It was founded as the Alberta Art Foundation in 1972 as a result of an act passed by the Government of Alberta that year. However, the organizations that form the core of what is now the Alberta Foundation for the Arts date to 1946 when Alberta formalized support of arts and culture. All of the agencies were combined in 1991 when the Foundation began to provide grants.

AFA's art collection was also established in 1972 and via the agency's travelling exhibit program, which was created in tandem with Alberta's 75th anniversary, it brings the collection to communities throughout the province.
