= List of festivals in Edmonton =

Festivals of Edmonton
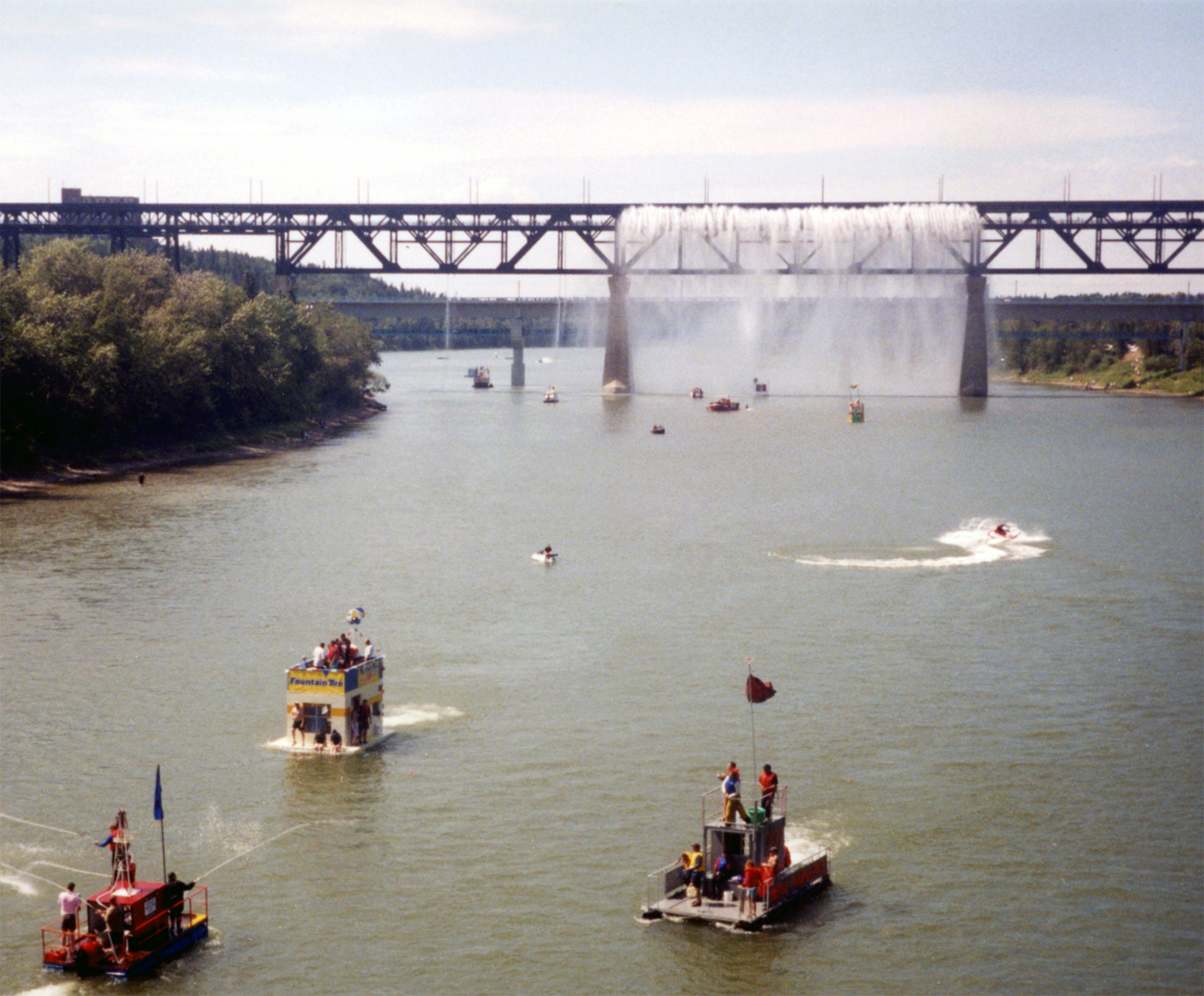

Related topics
- Festivals of Canada; festivals of Alberta; lists of festivals by city (Calgary; Edmonton; Lethbridge; Montreal; Ottawa; Toronto; Vancouver; Winnipeg); Culture of Edmonton; Tourism in Edmonton

This is an incomplete list of festivals in Edmonton, a city in the province of Alberta, Canada. Edmonton plays host to several large festivals each year, hence its local nickname as 'the Festival City.'

This list includes festivals of diverse types, including regional festivals, commerce festivals, fairs, food festivals, arts festivals, religious festivals, folk festivals, and recurring festivals on holidays.

== List of festivals ==
Festival	Month	Description
Animethon	August	Western Canada's longest-running Japanese animation festival is held in Downtown Edmonton in Edmonton Convention Centre. Animethon has been running since 1993 with attendance at over 15,000 people.
Bikeology Festival	June	Cycling culture
Blueberry Bluegrass and Country Music Festival	late July / early August	Bluegrass and country music festival
Blue Quill Party in the Park Music Festival	September	free, family-focused, and community-minded 12-hour-long non-stop live performance music festival
Canada Day	July	Celebrated with a pancake breakfast and other morning events at the Alberta Legislature grounds, and fireworks.
Cariwest	mid-August	Caribbean carnival
Chinese New Year	January/February	Celebrated in many locations including Bonnie Doon Mall, West Edmonton Mall, Kingsway Mall, and Chinatown, Edmonton.
Deep Freeze: A Byzantine Winter Festival	January	Arts and winter games celebrating Ukrainian, Franco-Albertan, Franco-African, Indigenous, and Acadian/East Coast communities.
Dreamspeakers International Film Festival	June	Aboriginal filmmakers, performers and artists
Edmonton Accordion Festival	September	Accordion
Edmonton Chante	September	Francophone music festival
Edmonton Dragon Boat Festival	August	Dragon boat
Edmonton Folk Music Festival	August	Folk music
Edmonton Heritage Festival	August	This ethnocultural food and heritage festival takes place in Hawrelak Park on the Heritage Day long weekend.
Edmonton International Beerfest	late March – early April	Craft beer and food festival
Edmonton International Film Festival	late September – early October	Independent film
Edmonton International Fringe Festival	August	Held in Old Strathcona, this is an exhibition of alternative theatre and is the largest fringe theatre festival in North America, and second only to the Edinburgh Fringe festival in the world.
TD Edmonton International Jazz Festival	June	Jazz music
Edmonton International Street Performer's Festival	July	Busking
Edmonton Latin Festival	mid-August	Latin culture and music
Edmonton Music & Speech Arts Festival	mid-April – early May	Started in 1908 - First Festival, of its kind, in North America - Classical Music (Piano, Strings, Voice, Guitar, Band, Choir, Brass, Woodwinds, Harp, Orchestra), Musical Theatre, Speech Arts - for Ages 5–85+
Edmonton Poetry Festival	April	Poetry
Edmonton Pride	June	LGBTQ+ and Gay pride
Edmonton Rock Music Festival	August	Rock music
Edmonton Rocky Mountain Wine & Food Festival	October	Wine, beer, spirits, food
Edmonton Short Film Festival	3rd week of October	Independent film
Edmonton Ukrainian Festival	late May	Ukrainian culture, food, music, visual arts, crafts and dance
Found Festival	June	Edmonton's only multidisciplinary found space arts festival. Find art in unexpected places!
Freewill Shakespeare Festival (formerly called River City Shakespeare Festival)	late June – early July	Shakespeare plays
Great Outdoors Comedy Festival	July	Outdoor comedy festival produced by Trixstar LIVE
Hip Hop in the Park festival	May	Musicians', performers' festival to celebrate a hiphop declaration of peace
Ice on Whyte Festival	January	Winter festival, skating, ice sculpture
Improvaganza	June	Improv festival hosted by Rapid Fire Theatre
International Festival of Winter Cinema	February	Films about winter, polar, or alpine topics; projected outdoors on a snow-screen.
Kaleido Family Arts Festival	September	Arts festival of free performances on Alberta Avenue
K-Days	July	Provides rides, music and other entertainment. Originally Klondike Days was an annual fair and exhibition which eventually adopted a gold rush theme. Activities include chuckwagon races, carnival rides and fairways, music, trade shows and daily fireworks.
Latino Heritage Month September 15 to October 15	September – October	Cultural roots and education
LitFest: Edmonton's Nonfiction Festival	late October	Non-fiction writing
Mid-Autumn Festival	September	Chinese cultural performances, activities, and a lantern parade including floating water lanterns on the pool in front of Edmonton City Hall.
Nextfest	June	Celebrate the work of emerging artists: musicians, actors, poets, visual artists, dancers
Northwestfest	May	Documentary film festival at the Garneau Theatre
Pets in the Park	June	Fun for animals and humans in Hawrelak Park
Play the Fool Festival	late September	Theatre festival focusing on clown and physical comedy
Pure Speculation	November	Geek and fan culture
Purple City Music Festival	August	Multi-day, multi-venue live music festival in downtown
Rainbow Visions Film Festival	November	LGBT film festival at the Garneau Theatre
Rockin' Thunder Festival	Second weekend of July	Rock & Alternative music festival at the Edmonton Exhibition Grounds
Silver Skate Festival	February	Winter
SkirtsAfire, herArts Festival	March	Edmonton's only multidisciplinary arts festival celebrating and elevating the work of women. Includes musicians, dance, spoken word, theatre, film, cabaret and more.
Sourdough River Festival	August	Raft race
Strathearn Art Walk	September	Free, family friendly art and music festival
Symphony Under the Sky Festival	Labour Day weekend	Edmonton Symphony Orchestra's annual outdoor concert
Taste of Edmonton	July	Food and restaurants
Vocal Arts Festival	late May – June	Opera NUOVA's Opera / art song festival, performances, workshops, and elite study opportunities.
Water For Life Festival	early June	The all volunteers-directed Sunshine Treeshade Humanitarian Charity presents "water for life"-themed multi arts, science, and recreation events in support of clean healthy water commons and saving the estimated daily global average of over 4000 children and others currently projected to be killed by contaminated water related conditions (World Health Organization, UNICEF data). Held week of World Environment Day, June 5; and World Oceans Day, June 8.
The Works Art & Design Festival	late June – early August	Showcases Canadian and international art and design from well-known, award-winning artists, as well as emerging and student artists
Edmonton Filipino Fiesta	September	Celebration of Filipino-Canadian Heritage

== Former festivals ==
- Carnival of Shrieking Youth
- HarvestMoon Music and Arts Festival
- Interstellar Rodeo
- SONiC BOOM
- Punk in Drublic Fest

== See also ==
- List of festivals in Alberta
- List of festivals in Canada
- List of attractions and landmarks in Edmonton
