= List of tourist attractions in Edmonton =

Aspect of Canadian city

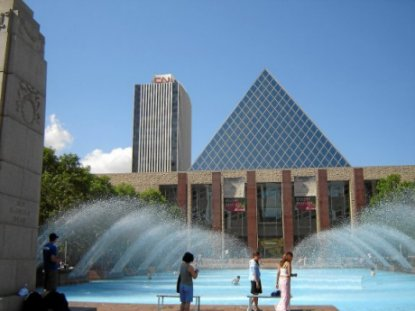
Edmonton City Hall and Churchill Square

The following is a list of attractions and landmarks in and around Edmonton, Alberta, Canada.

== Downtown ==
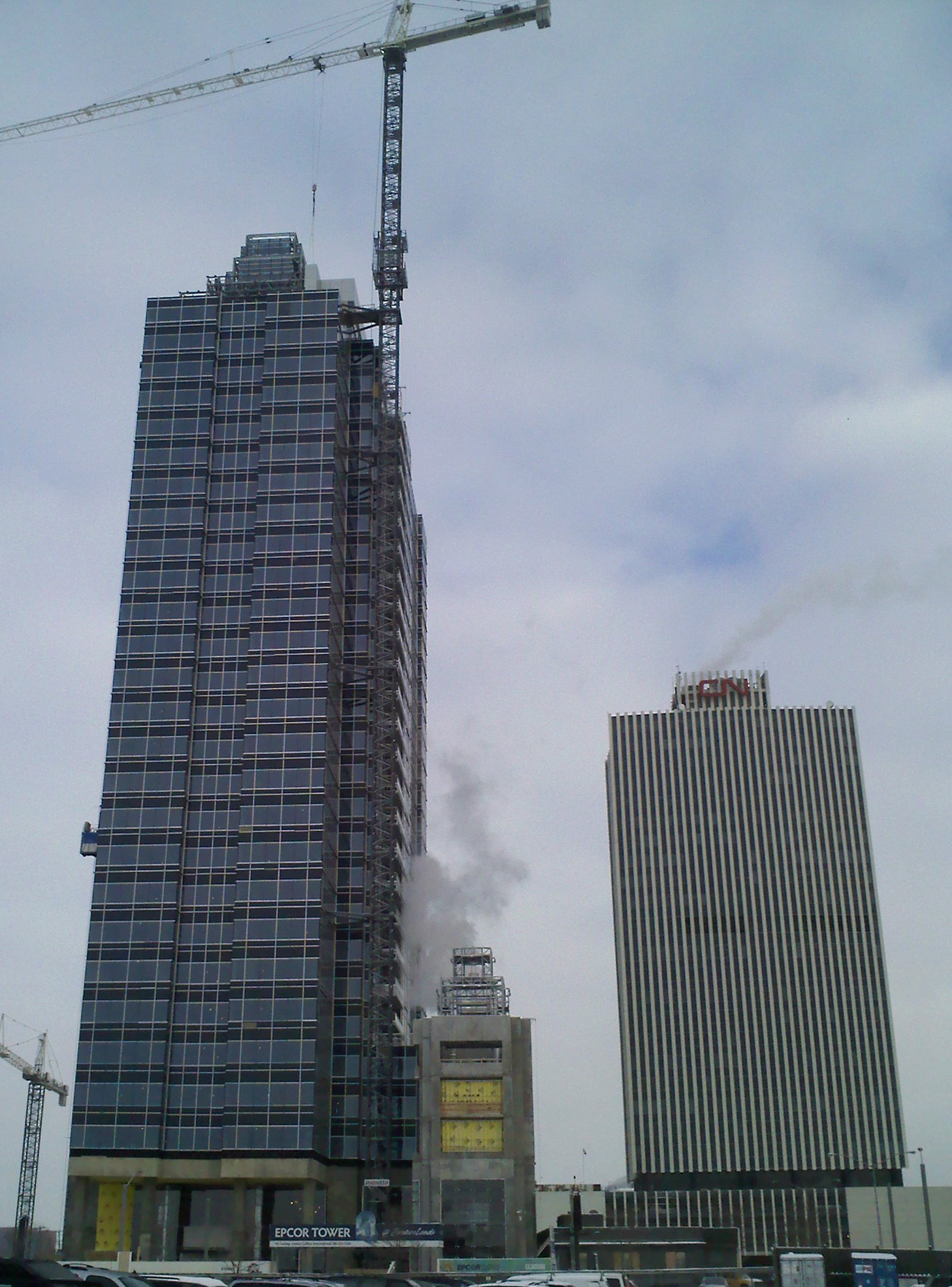
EPCOR Tower and CN Tower

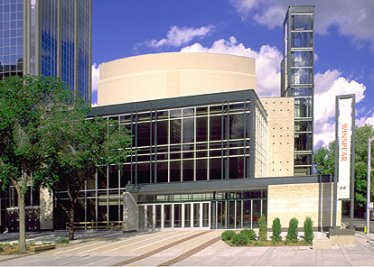
Winspear Centre is a major theatre and music centre in downtown Edmonton.

- 100 Street Funicular
- Alberta Legislature Building
- Art Gallery of Alberta (formerly Edmonton Art Gallery)
- Chinatown
- Citadel Theatre
- Edmonton City Hall
- Edmonton Ski Club
- EPCOR Tower
- Francis Winspear Centre for Music
- Gibson Block flatiron building
- Harcourt House
- High Level Bridge Streetcar, from Downtown to Whyte Avenue
- Hotel Macdonald
- Ice District
  - Edmonton Tower
  - Grand Villa Casino
  - JW Marriott Edmonton
  - Rogers Place
    - Edmonton Oilers NHL team
  - Stantec Tower viewing deck
- Latitude 53
- Little Italy
- MacEwan University City Centre Campus
  - MacEwan Centre for Sport and Wellness
- North Saskatchewan River valley parks system
- Ociciwan Contemporary Art Centre
- RE/MAX Field (formerly Telus Field)
- Royal Alberta Museum
- Shaw Conference Centre
- Sir Winston Churchill Square
- Ukrainian Canadian Archives & Museum Of Alberta
- Warehouse District; 104 Street
  - Neon Sign Museum

== North ==
- Alberta Railway Museum
- Alberta Aviation Museum
- Joe Clarke Athletic Grounds
  - Clarke Stadium
  - Commonwealth Stadium
    - Edmonton Elks CFL team
- Northern Alberta Institute of Technology (NAIT)
- Northgate Centre
- Northlands (formerly Northlands Park)
  - Edmonton Expo Centre (formerly Agricom)
  - K-Days
- North Town Centre
- Roxy Theatre
- Telus World of Science (formerly Edmonton Space and Sciences Centre)
- 124 Street Area

== West ==
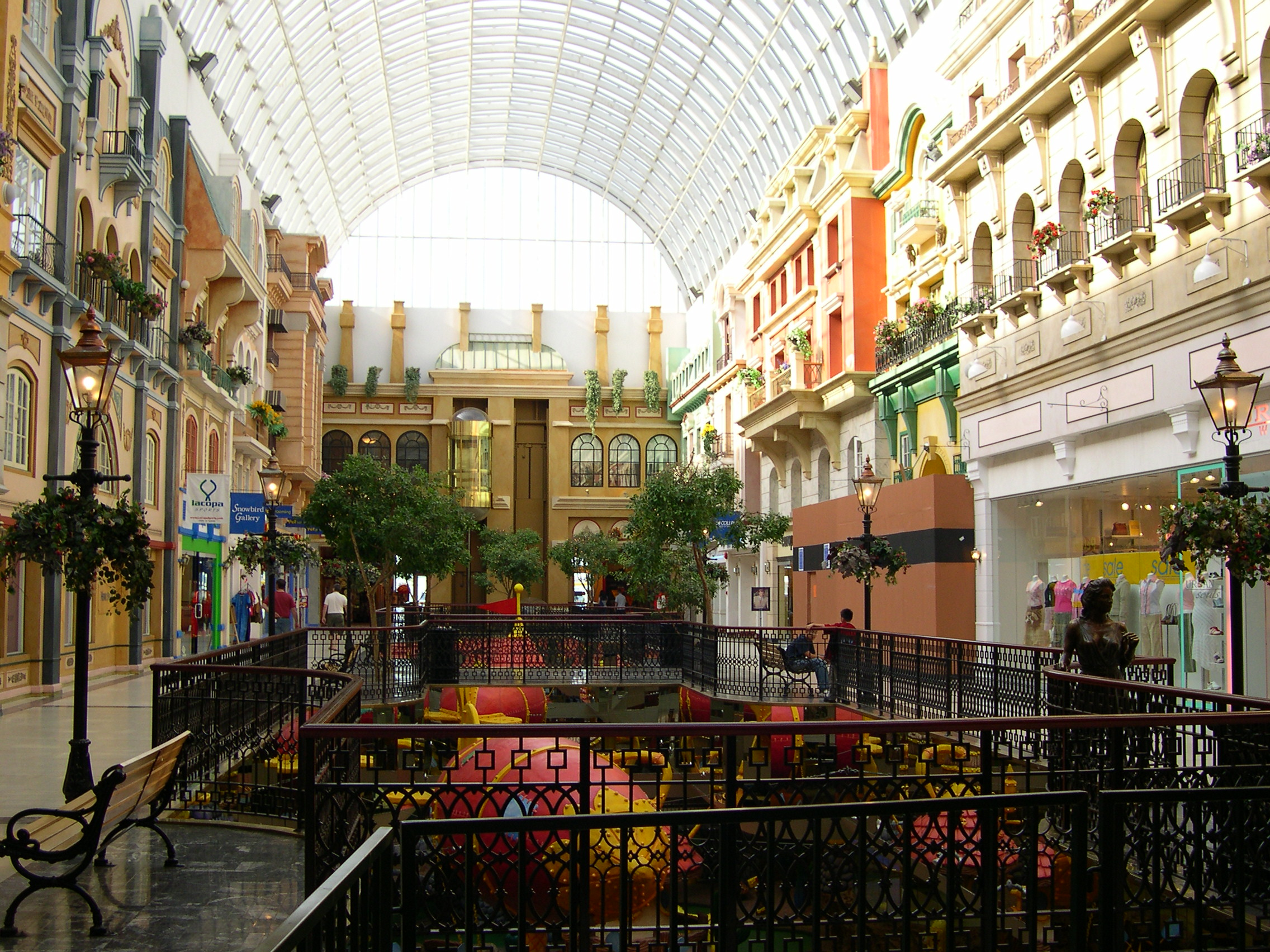
Europa Boulevard, West Edmonton Mall

- Edmonton Valley Zoo
- Snow Valley Ski Club
- West Edmonton Mall
  - Galaxyland (formerly "Fantasyland")
  - World Waterpark

== South ==
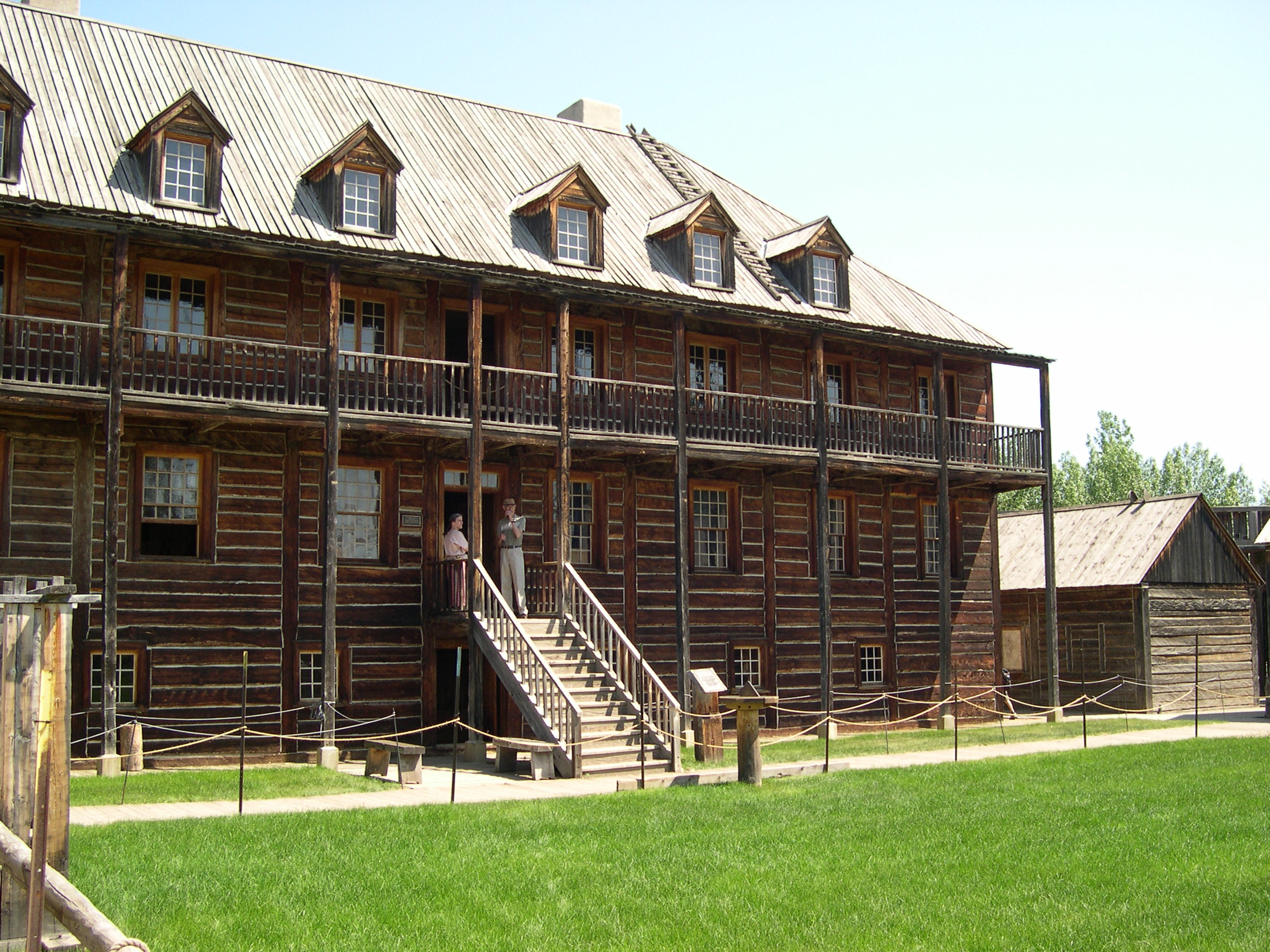
Rowand House in Fort Edmonton Park

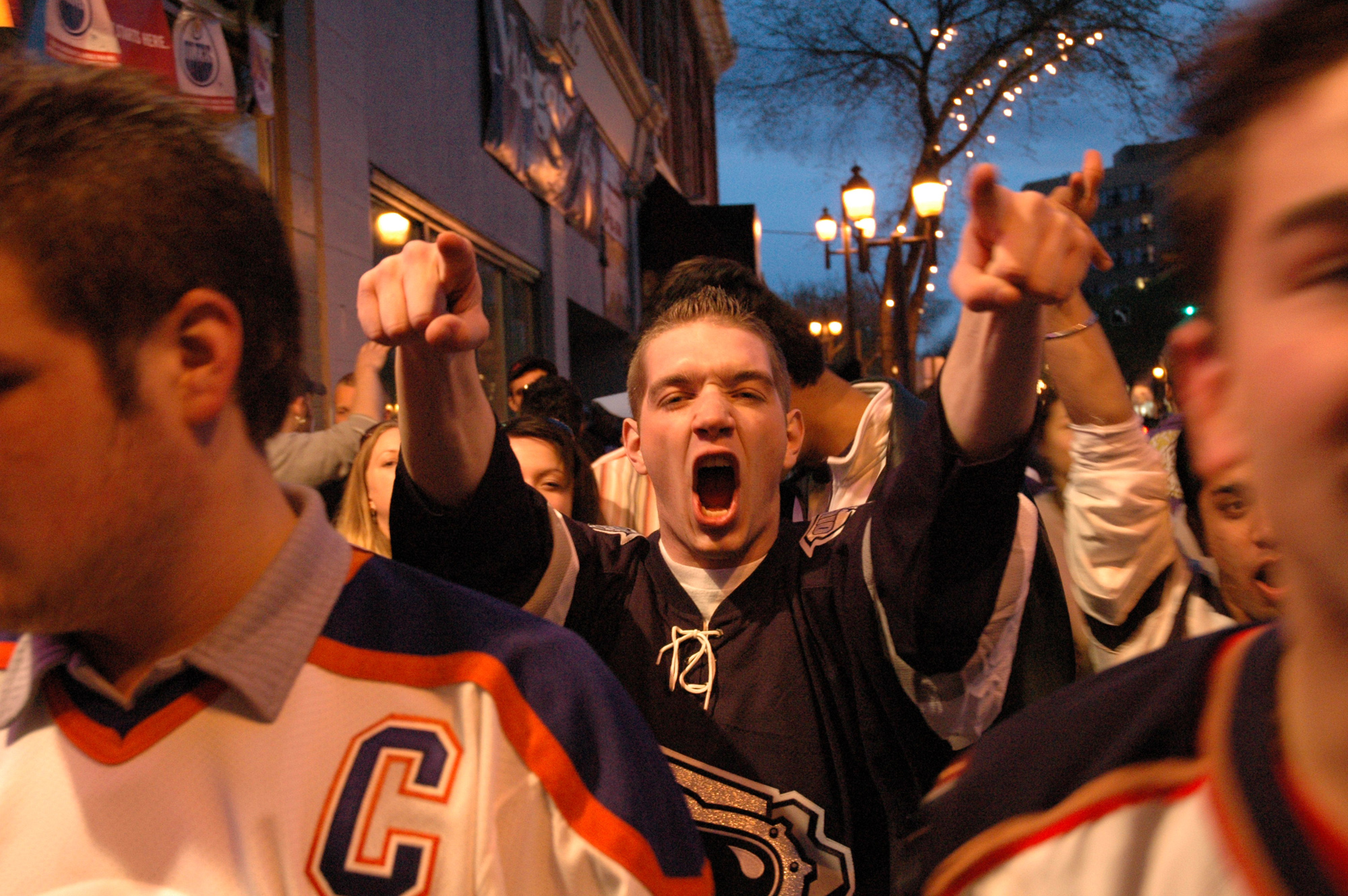
Whyte Avenue in Old Strathcona has numerous popular bars

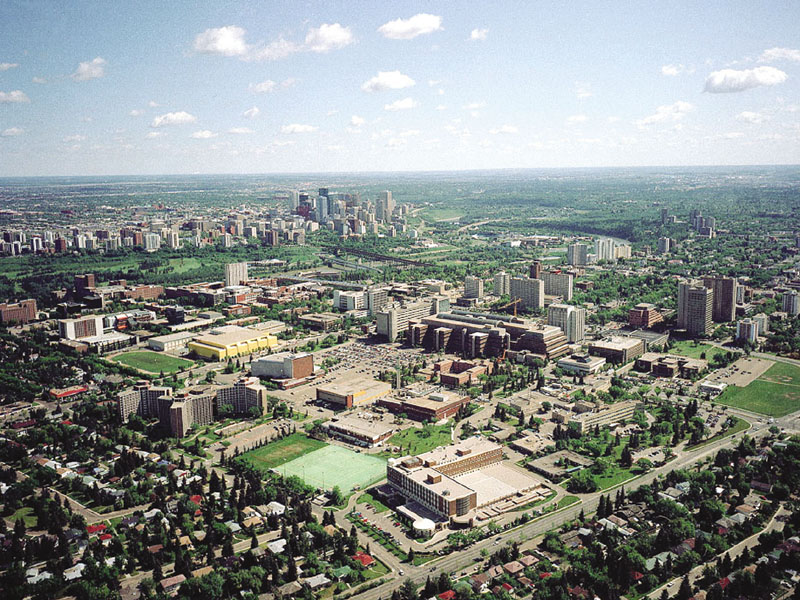
The University of Alberta contains over 90 buildings.

- Castrol Raceway (formerly Capital City Raceway & Labatt Raceway)
- Fort Edmonton Park
- Indigenous Art Park
- Mill Woods Park
- Old Strathcona
  - Catalyst Theatre
  - Garneau Theatre
  - Kinsmen Field House
  - Queen Elizabeth Pool
  - Ritchie Mill
  - Strathcona Canadian Pacific Railway Station
  - Strathcona Farmers Market
  - Varscona Theatre
  - Walterdale Theatre
  - Whyte Avenue
- South Edmonton Common
- Southgate Centre
- University of Alberta Main Campus
  - Clare Drake Arena
  - Foote Field
  - Northern Alberta Jubilee Auditorium
  - Rutherford House
  - Universiade Pavilion (Butterdome)
- William Hawrelak Park

== East ==
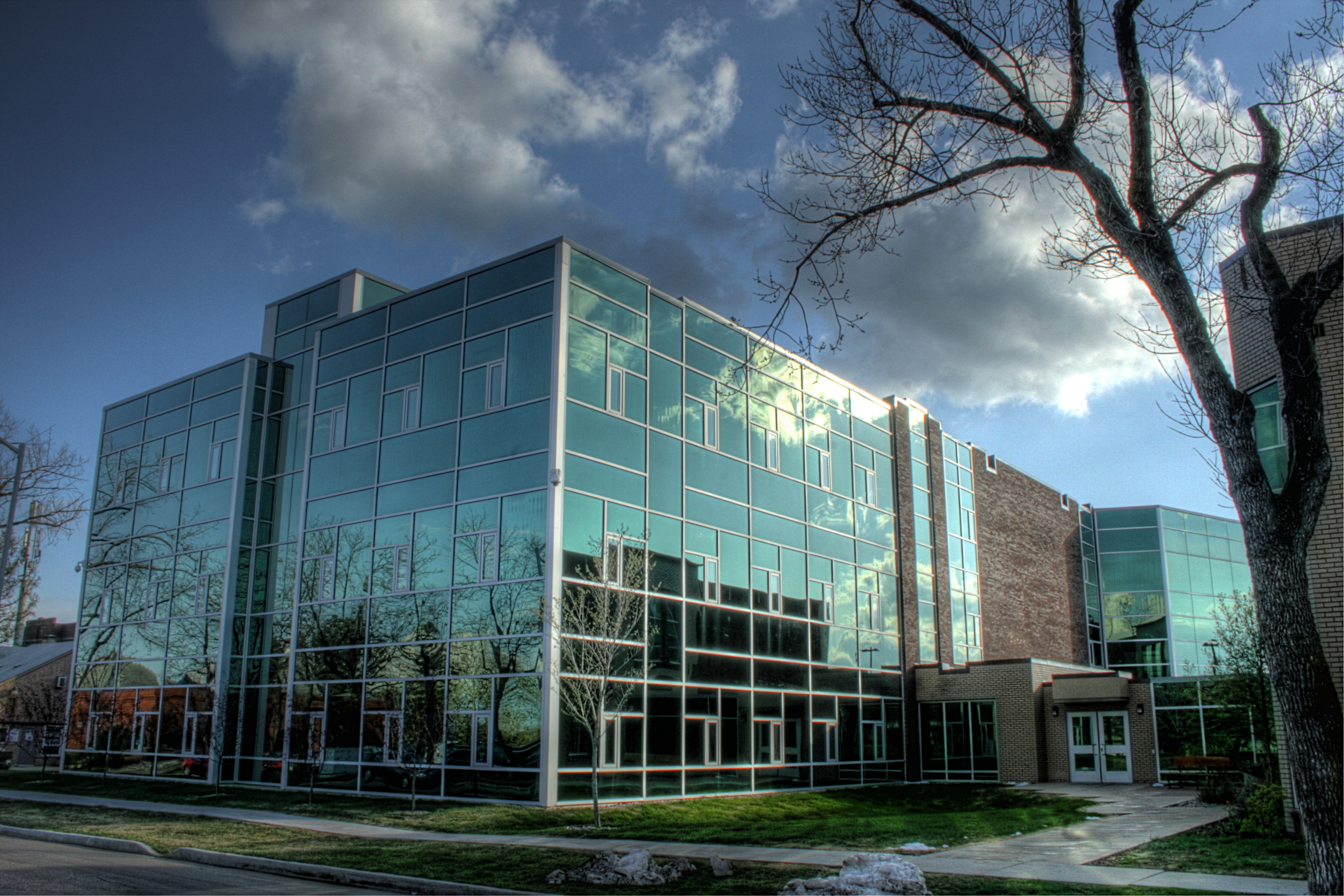
Hole Academic Centre, on the campus of Concordia College

- Abbottsfield Mall
- Concordia University of Edmonton
- Edmonton Queen, a river-boat
- Muttart Conservatory
- Rundle Park
- Strathcona Science Provincial Park

== See also ==
- List of tallest buildings in Edmonton
- Heritage buildings in Edmonton
- List of festivals in Edmonton
