= Carlton Cinema (Toronto) =

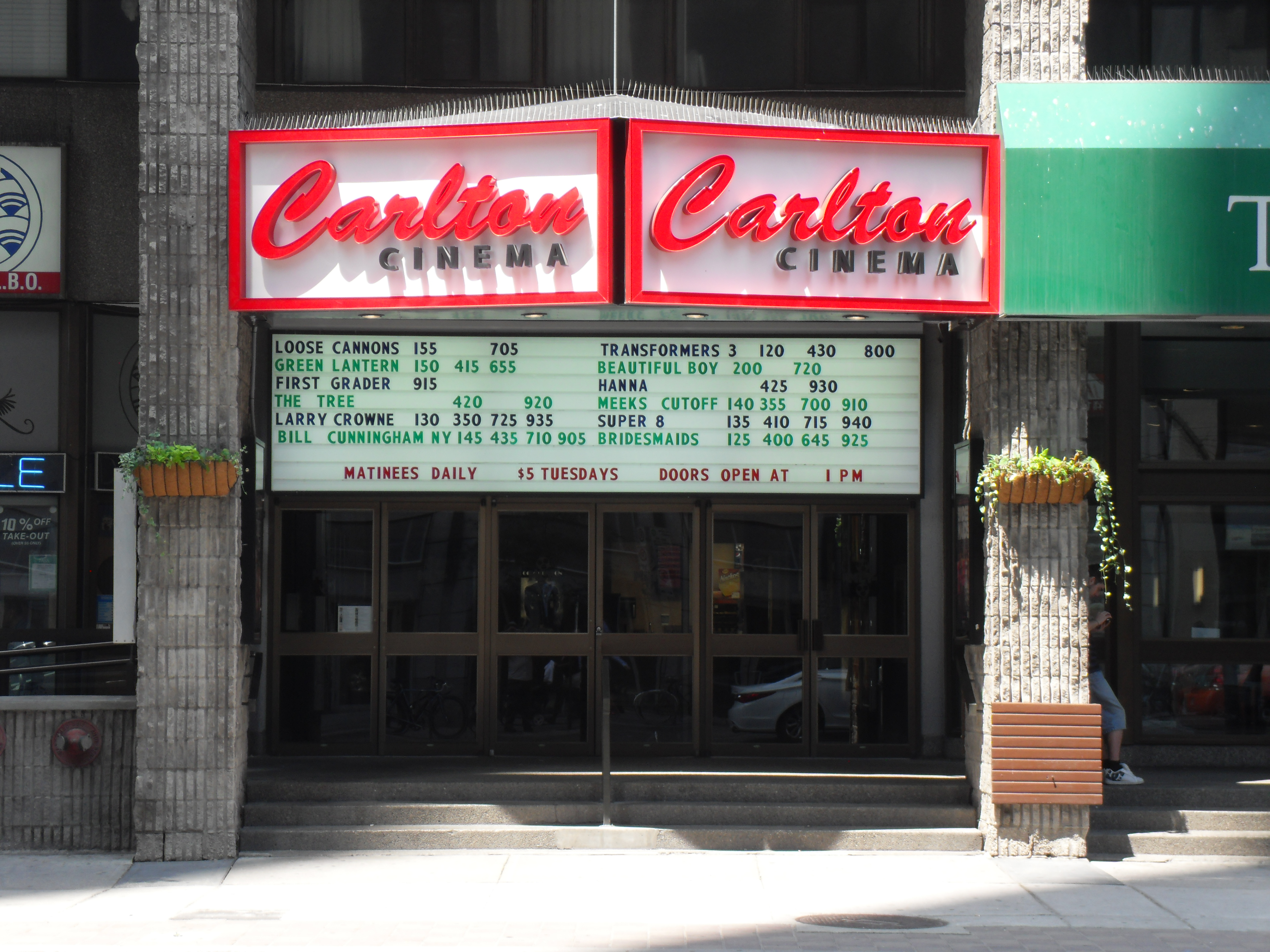

- Location of Carlton Cinemas in Toronto

General information
- Type: Cinema
- Location: 20 Carlton Street, Toronto, Ontario, Canada
- Coordinates: 43.661634°N 79.3838695°W

Other information
- Public transit: College station

Website
- imaginecinemas.com/cinema/carlton-cinema/

The Carlton Cinema is a cinema in Toronto, Ontario, Canada. It is located on Carlton Street on the original premises of the historic Odeon Theatre and is known for playing films that the larger chain theatres ignore.

== History ==
Founded in 1981 on the original premises of the historic Odeon Theatre—which was operated between 1949 and 1973 as the Canadian flagship of Odeon Cinemas—the Carlton Cinema became the first multiplex in Toronto to focus on art-house content. It ran continuously for 28 years before being closed in 2009 by Cineplex Odeon.

In 2010, it was re-opened under new management, Rainbow and Magic Lantern Theatres, who ran the cinema until 2016, when it was acquired by Imagine Cinemas. It was subsequently reopened in 2017.

The cinema is well known in Toronto for playing foreign, arthouse, and independent films that are often ignored by larger chain theatres.

== See also ==
- List of cinemas in Toronto
