= Odeon Theatre Toronto =

The Odeon Theatre Toronto was a movie theatre located at 20 Carlton Street in Toronto, Ontario. Designed by architect Jay English and operating between 1949 and 1973, the theatre was the Canadian flagship of Odeon Cinemas and one of Toronto's best examples of Streamline Moderne architecture.

== History ==
Odeon Cinemas was founded in 1928 by Oscar Deutsch in Brierley Hill, England. In 1938, the company was bought by J. Arthur Rank, and shortly after this time, a Canadian arm of the business was opened, called Odeon Theatres Canada. Toronto's first Odeon theatre was the Odeon Fairlawn, located at 3320 Yonge Street, and was also designed by Jay English. The Odeon Fairlawn opened on 14 August 1947.

A year later, Odeon began construction on a new flagship theatre which was designed by English. The Odeon Theatre Toronto contained 2,318 seats, a restaurant, and Odeon's Canadian offices. The theatre opened on 9 September 1948 with the North-American premiere of Oliver Twist. The screening was attended by Patricia Roc and Trevor Howard, the posters and newspaper ads boasting that it was, “The Showplace of the Dominion.” It contained a restaurant on the mezzanine level, the first theatre-restaurant in Canada. In 1956, the theatre's name was changed to the Odeon Carlton, which it would remain until its closure.

By the early 1970s, the cinema was struggling financially. For a brief period, the city of Toronto considered purchasing it as a home for the Canadian Opera Company. However, this was deemed financially ruinous for the city, since it was already subsidizing the O’Keefe Centre, now named the Meridian Hall as of 2019.

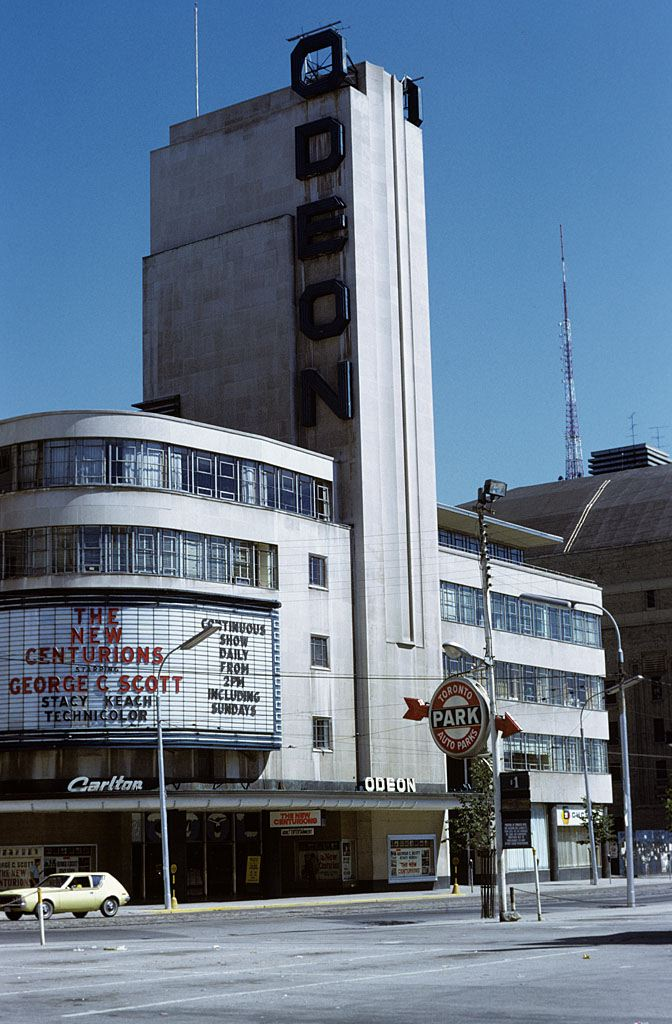
The Odeon Carlton cinema in 1972, on Carlton Street in Toronto, Ontario, Canada, showing the film The New Centurions (1972).

On the site of the Odeon Carlton today there is an office building that contains the Carlton Cinema, a small multiplex.

== Carlton Cinema ==
In 1981, on the same site, the first multiplex in Toronto to focus on art-house content built. It ran continuously for 28 years before being closed in 2009 by Cineplex Odeon. In 2010, it was re-opened under new management, Rainbow and Magic Lantern Theatres, who ran the cinema until 2016, when it was acquired by Imagine Cinemas.

The cinema is well known in Toronto for playing foreign, arthouse, and independent films that are often ignored by larger chain theatres.
