= Edmonton International Beerfest =

Annual festival in Edmonton, Alberta, Canada

Edmonton's International BeerFest
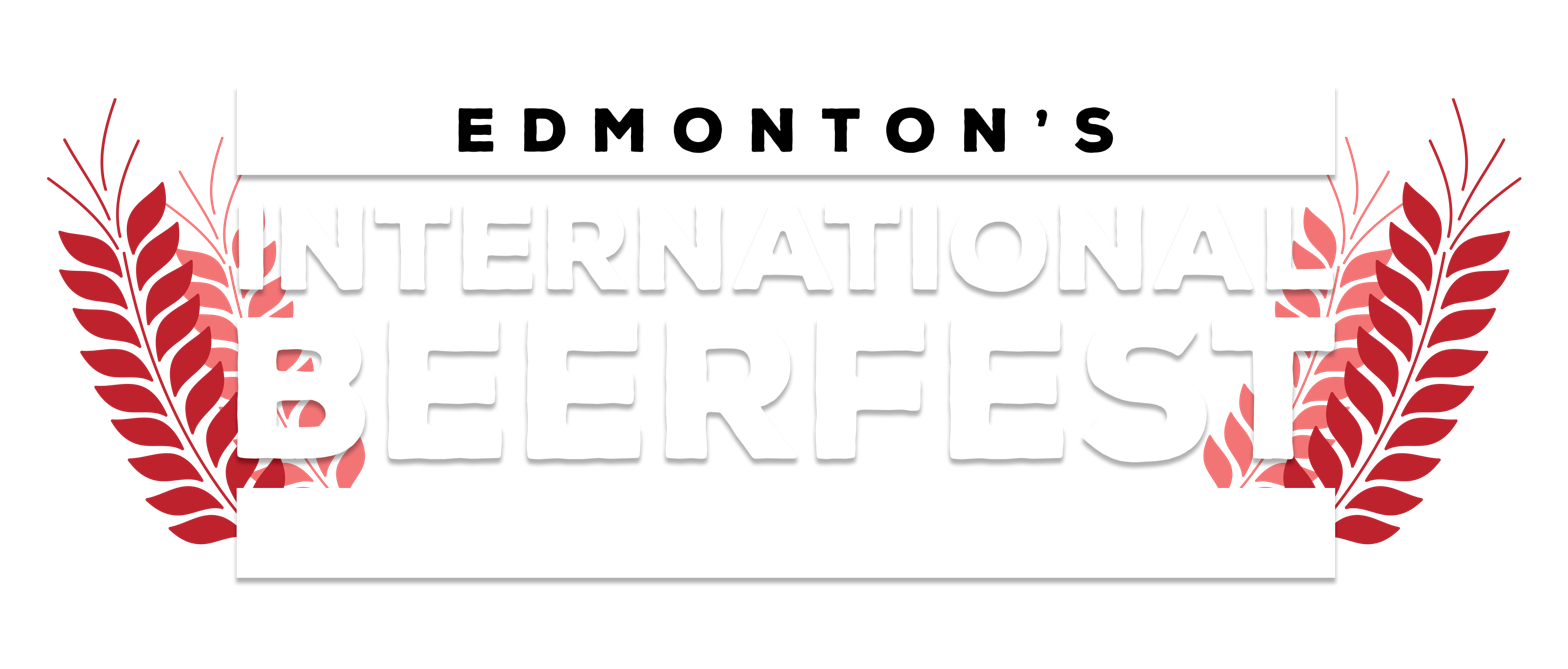
- Nickname: Edmonton BeerFest
- Status: Active
- Genre: Beer festival
- Frequency: Annual
- Locations: Edmonton, Alberta
- Country: Canada
- Years active: 2006–2020, 2023–present
- Founder: Sean Farmer
- Organiser: Loud City Sound Inc.
- Website: internationalbeerfest.com

Edmonton's International BeerFest, commonly known as Edmonton BeerFest, is an annual festival in Edmonton, Alberta, Canada. The festival combines beer and beverage tasting with live music and performance, food and hospitality, educational programming, local businesses and other community and cultural activities. The first ticketed Edmonton edition was held in 2006. Following its early growth, the festival moved to the Shaw Conference Centre in downtown Edmonton.

During the festival's early years, its organizers also produced BeerFest and related beverage festivals in other Alberta communities. The festival returned to the Edmonton Convention Centre in 2023 following the postponement of its scheduled 2020 edition, and was held there again in 2024 and 2025. In 2026, the festival moved outdoors to Sir Winston Churchill Square and introduced a six-day, all-ages format called BeerFest Days. Programming included beverages, food, concerts, live performances, fashion, street entertainment and other community and cultural activities.

== History ==
The BeerFest concept developed through smaller beverage, hospitality and entertainment activities before the establishment of the annual Edmonton festival. The first ticketed Edmonton BeerFest was held in 2006 at Dinwoodie Lounge at the University of Alberta. The inaugural Edmonton festival there were reportedly more than 700 prospective attendees reportedly turned away. Following the inaugural Edmonton edition, BeerFest moved to a 40,000-square-foot hall at the Shaw Conference Centre. In April 2008, Vue Weekly reported more than 55 exhibitors offering approximately 150 beers at the Shaw Conference Centre. The festival also included live entertainment, food, non-beverage exhibitors, an on-site liquor store and a Beer School presented by the Edmonton Homebrewers' Guild. In 2009, Metro Edmonton reported more than 60 vendors and at least 200 beers at the festival, together with eight local bands and DJs.

The Edmonton Journal reported that the 2009 festival also offered educational seminars. During the festival's early development, its organizers produced related BeerFest and beverage festivals in communities outside Edmonton. In September 2009, Edmontonians reported that the operation had expanded to seven similar shows in Alberta and that those shows collectively attracted tens of thousands of attendees. The Lethbridge festival was held at Exhibition Park. A contemporary event listing documents a Lethbridge International BeerFest at Exhibition Park in November 2009. Festival organizational records identify the local festival as Lethbridge BeerFest and indicate that BeerFest programming continued in Lethbridge after the 2009 edition. In 2016, Global News referred to the event as the festival's 10th anniversary.

The Festival scheduled for March 27 and 28, 2020 was postponed. BeerFest returned to the Edmonton Convention Centre on March 24 and 25, 2023. Tickets issued for the postponed 2020 festival were honoured for the 2023 dates. In March 2024, the Cicerone Certification Program announced that it would not participate in the 2024 Edmonton International BeerFest. The organization stated that images and language used in festival promotion did not align with its values and that it had requested the removal of Cicerone events and branding from festival materials. In May 2026 Taproot Edmonton and CTV News reported allegations from two vendors who said they were still owed money related to the 2025 festival. Festival organizer Sean Farmer responded that an unpaid amount could indicate that procedures had not been followed, that organizers had not been made aware of an issue, or that a participant had operated outside the arrangement for which it had registered.

=== BeerFest Days ===
In 2026, Edmonton's International BeerFest moved from the Edmonton Convention Centre to Sir Winston Churchill Square and introduced BeerFest Days, a six-day outdoor festival held from June 4 to June 9.

== Festival programming ==
In 2008, Vue Weekly described a festival containing local microbreweries, international breweries, food, live entertainment, non-beverage exhibitors and Beer School programming. The following year, Metro Edmonton reported that eight local bands and DJs performed alongside more than 60 beverage exhibitors. In 2014, Global News reported that more than 200 beers were available for tasting at the festival and that the event included an entertainment lineup. The beverage component has included Edmonton and Alberta producers alongside breweries and brands from elsewhere in Canada and internationally. In 2018, festival programming included a Craft Beer Village featuring Alberta breweries, together with Beer School sessions devoted to beer tasting, brewing and food pairing. In 2019, Global News reported that the festival featured more than 120 breweries, merchants and food vendors at the Edmonton Convention Centre. The 2024 festival featured more than 120 breweries, merchants and food vendors, with local cuisine, live entertainment, classes, demonstrations and workshops.

=== Community and cultural programming ===
Local entertainment was present during the festival's early years. Metro Edmonton reported in 2009 that the festival used eight local bands and DJs, while GigCity described the 2011 musical lineup as consisting entirely of local performers. Metro Edmonton reported eight local bands and DJs at the 2009 festival and in 2011, GigCity reported that local bands performed throughout the festival. The lineup included Chad Cook, Red Ram, Punch Drunk Cabaret, The Wheat Pool, Shocker, White Lightening, Short of Able, Sister Gray and Line of Sight. A flair-bartending performance was also included. The 2018 lineup included Amy Hef, Karimah, Archaics, Tallest to Shortest and Rottin' Dan and the Lightin' Child. The 2024 festival featured musician Stirling John as part of its entertainment programming. In 2025, musical performers included L.A.M.S, Love Empire and You, Me & Zach. The festival also featured contortionist Matt Alaeddine and burlesque performer Melody Mangler.

With the introduction of BeerFest Days in 2026, community and culture became more explicit elements of the public festival format. The Edmonton Downtown Business Association described BeerFest Days as a six-day festival involving local breweries, food vendors and entertainment, with free admission, programming for all ages and an emphasis on community and culture. Travel Alberta described the 2026 festival as combining local, national and international beverage producers with concerts, live performances, fashion shows, demonstrations and interactive experiences.

=== Beer education ===
The 2008 festival included a Beer School presented by the Edmonton Homebrewers' Guild, where participants were introduced to beer flavours, styles, malt and hops. The Edmonton Journal reported educational seminars as part of the 2009 festival. By 2018, Beer School programming included sessions on tasting, brewing and food pairing led by brewery and beverage-industry representatives. Educational classes, demonstrations and workshops remained part of the festival in 2024.

== Recognition ==
Edmonton's International BeerFest received Vue Weekly's Golden Fork Award for Best Beverage Festival in 2014 and 2015. The festival was runner-up in the category in 2016, 2017 and 2018. The Canadian Choice Award has also listed Edmonton's International BeerFest as a winner in its Festival category.

== See also ==
- Festivals in Edmonton
- Beer festival
- Culture of Edmonton
- Edmonton Convention Centre
- Sir Winston Churchill Square
