= Louise McKinney Riverfront Park =

Municipal park in Alberta, Canada

Coordinates: 53.541°N 113.481°W

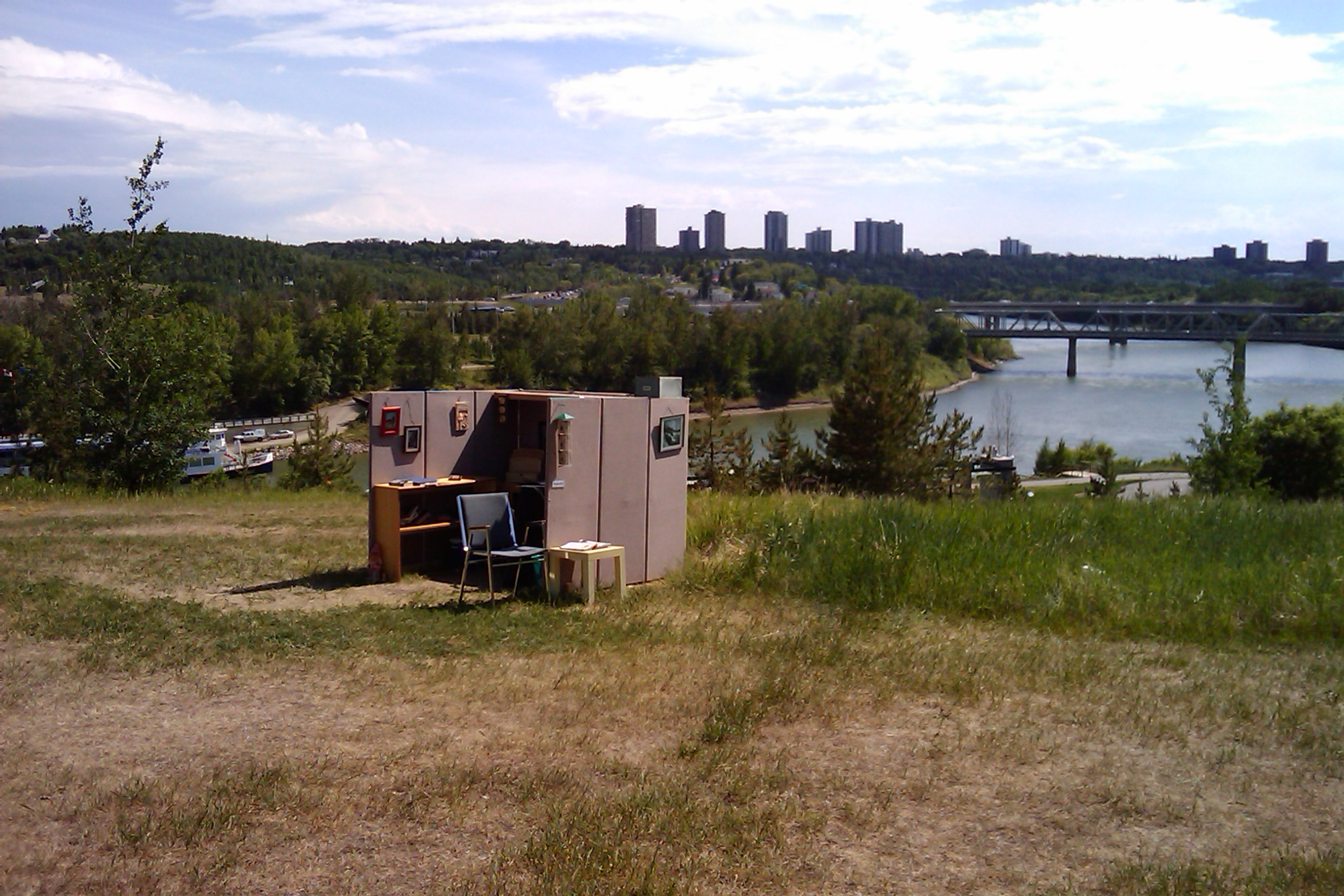
A view of the North Saskatchewan River, Henrietta Muir Edwards Park, and the Edmonton Riverboat from the top of the Louise McKinney Park.

Louise McKinney Riverfront Park, or Louise McKinney Park, is a municipal park in Edmonton, Alberta, Canada, and part of the North Saskatchewan River valley parks system. It serves as the gateway park, with paved paths leading from it to everywhere in the parks system. The Tawatinâ Bridge crosses the North Saskatchewan River, connecting Louise McKinney Park to the Henrietta Muir Edwards Park and the Edmonton Riverboat attraction. The park is the closest river valley park to Downtown Edmonton and is connected to the Hotel Macdonald via the 100 Street Funicular. The park also serves as a link in the Trans Canada Trail system.

== Development ==
In the 2000s, it underwent significant revitalization as part of Edmonton's “Ribbons of Green” river valley enhancement initiative, transforming the area into a modern gateway to the river valley parks system.

== Features ==
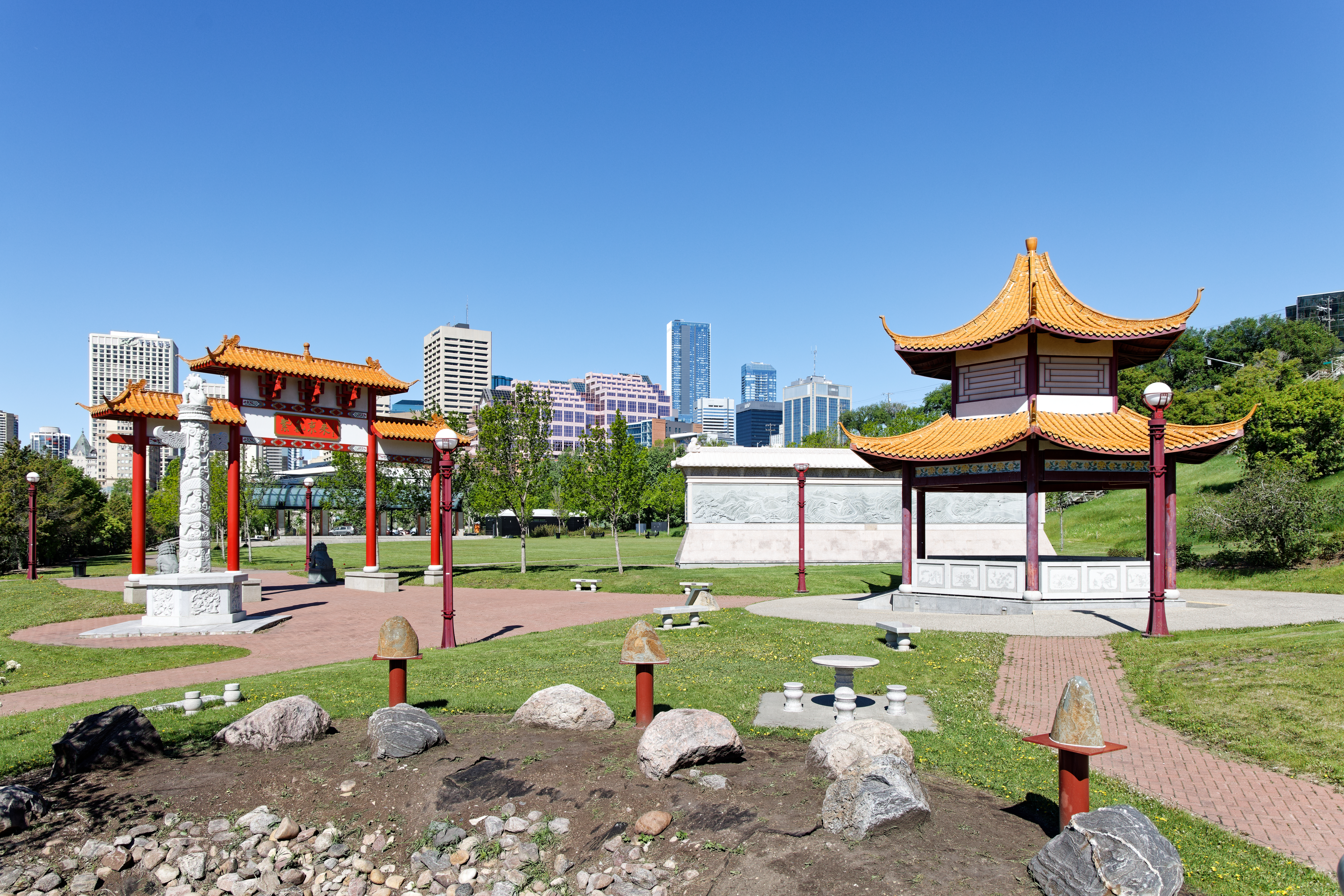
Chinese garden with gazebo and gate

- Boating: A public dock for canoes and other small boats is located at the riverfront part of the park.
- Garden: A Chinese garden is located in the park, the garden features a scenic path.
- Gazebo: A gazebo with an electrical outlet is located in the Chinese Garden. It is open for public booking.
- Promenade: A shelter-house is located on the riverfront park promenade sporting a public washroom along several other amenities.
