= Flashback Gay Bar =

Gay bar in Edmonton, Canada

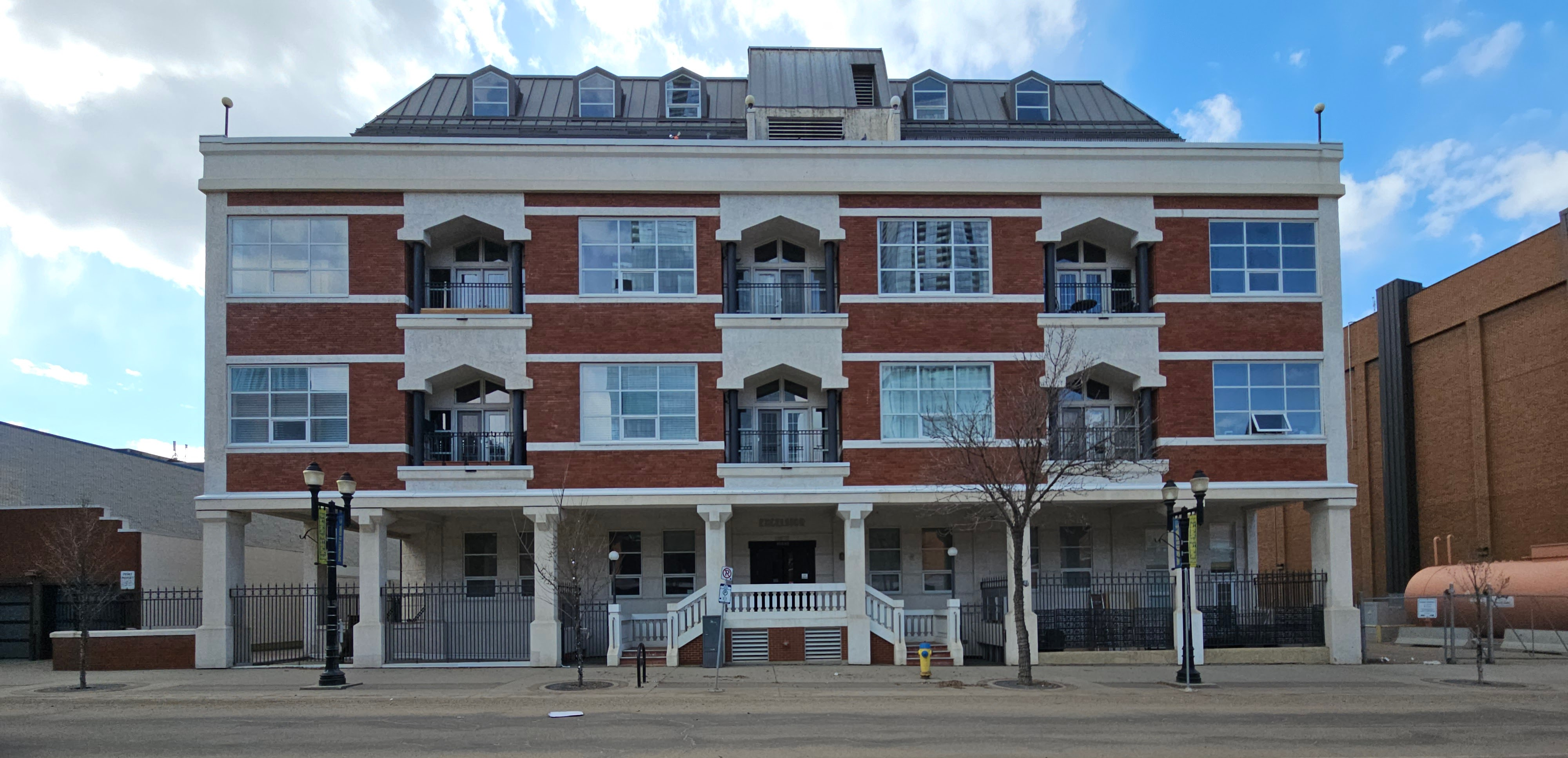
The current Excelsior Lofts in Edmonton, which was once the home of the Flashback Gay Bar.

Flashback was a gay bar and nightclub in Edmonton, Alberta, Canada from 1974 to 1991. It operated as a private members club first known as the Jasper Avenue Social Club Society, then as the 105 Street Bridge Club Society.

== History ==
Opened as a private club, the Jasper Avenue Social Cub Society operated a gay bar named Flashback on November 15, 1974 in a basement location at 11639 Jasper Avenue in Edmonton. As it gained popularity it moved to a larger location in what was then known as the Millar Building at 10330 - 104 Street in the Warehouse District of Downtown Edmonton where it opened its doors on November 4, 1977. The Millar Building is now known as the Excelsior Lofts, Edmonton's first loft style housing residence.

When the building owners decided not to renew their lease, Flashback moved to another warehouse building directly across the back alley and restructured as the 105 Street Bridge Club Society but still operated as Flashback.

The club was originally created for queer people and their friends by several members of Club 70, Edmonton's original private gay club. The restrictive membership policies of Club 70, which allowed entry only to gay or lesbian individuals, punished members with a suspension for 30 days if they were accompanied by cisgender heterosexuals.

== Legacy ==
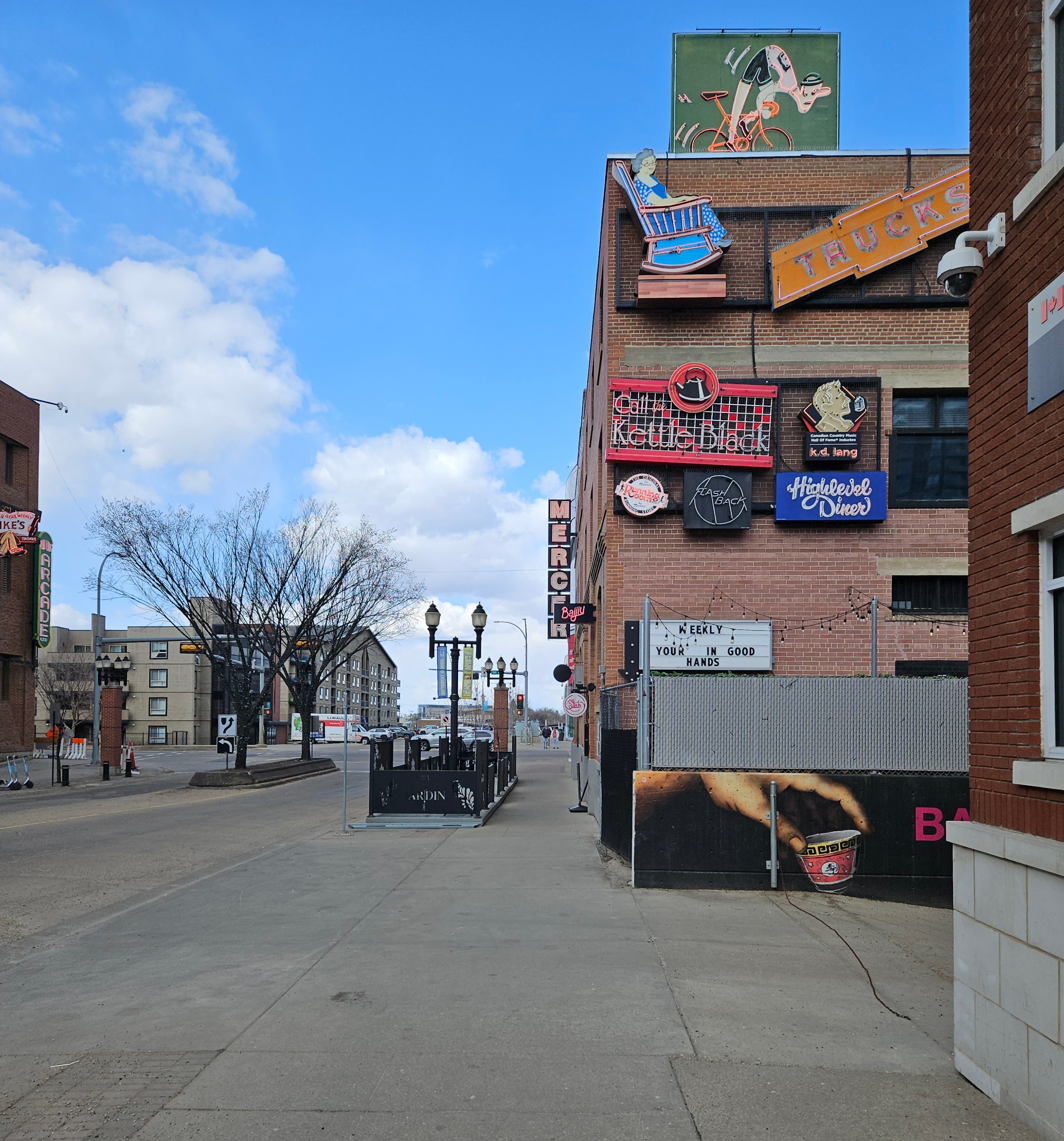
A part of Edmonton's Neon Sign Museum, displaying the sign of the Flashback.

The impact the bar had on the Edmonton Queer scene is now the subject of a new Telus Originals documentary film, Flashback, released in early 2024. Additionally, the bar's original neon sign was restored and added to the Edmonton Neon Sign Museum collection on June 17, 2023.

== See also ==
- List of LGBTQ bars
