= TD Edmonton International Jazz Festival =

Annual music festival in Canada

- Genre: Jazz
- Locations: Edmonton, Alberta, Canada
- Coordinates: 53.521°N 113.494°W
- Years active: 2005 – present
- Organiser: Edmonton Jazz Festival Society
- Sponsor: TD Bank
- Website: www.edmontonjazz.com

The TD Edmonton International Jazz Festival is an annual 10-day music festival in Edmonton, Alberta, Canada. The festival was founded in 2005 by the Edmonton Jazz Festival Society, and focuses on making jazz music accessible to as many people as possible. To this end, the festival showcases many different sub-genres of jazz, played by international stars as well as emerging local musicians.

While many genre-specific music festivals take a relaxed approach in how closely their performers align with the festival genre, the TD Edmonton International Jazz Festival is strict about their musicians being purely jazz performers. Notable acts of previous years include Dianne Reeves, Billy Childs, Donny McCaslin, Jacob Collier, Soil & "Pimp" Sessions, Moon Hooch, Chris Botti, Herbie Hancock, Bobby McFarren, Esperanza Spalding, Tommy Banks and P. J. Perry. In addition to traditional performances, many musicians also offer jazz workshops to teach local musicians more about the genre.

The festival does not have performances in one specific location, but is spread out in venues across the city. Regular venues include the Winspear Centre, the Yardbird Suite, Triffo Theatre, Varscona Theatre, Starlite Room, Old Strathcona Performing Arts Centre, and Bellamy's Lounge at the Chateau Lacombe Hotel. Each venue showcases different kinds of performers. The traditional concert halls host big-name acts, while the smaller jazz clubs tend to host local and niche artists.

== History ==
The festival began in 2005, when local musicians and business owners teamed up with the Edmonton Jazz Society (the organization that manages the Yardbird Suite) to produce the 60-event Yardbird Jazz Festival, which sought to promote Edmonton's vibrant jazz scene, as well as to offer young people the chance to learn from experienced musicians in a workshop setting. This festival was planned in a hurry, after it was revealed that the long-running "Jazz City" festival would be shutting down. Following this early prototype festival, the Edmonton Jazz Festival Society was formed in an effort to add some structure to the festival and avoid some of the financial and organizational pitfalls that Jazz City had faced.

In 2006, the newly formed Edmonton Jazz Festival Society sought financial aid from the Edmonton Arts Council and the Alberta Foundation for the Arts, and local business to present the next instalment of the festival. That year's festival saw the formation of The Edmonton Jazz Orchestra, which is a collection of 18 local musicians who compose, arrange, and perform songs that are meant to draw on the history of jazz, as well as define what it means to be a jazz lover in the city of Edmonton.

In 2007, the Yardbird Jazz Festival would adopt the name Edmonton International Jazz Festival, and in 2015, the name changed to its current form to reflect the new main sponsor of the festival, TD Bank.

== See also ==
- Festivals in Edmonton
- Festivals in Alberta
- List of jazz festivals
