= Edmonton International Street Performers Festival =

Annual performance festival in Canada

- Genre: Street performance
- Dates: July
- Locations: Edmonton, Alberta, Canada; 53.544°N 113.489°W
- Years active: 1985 – 2019, 2021-
- Website: edmontonstreetfest.com

The Edmonton International Street Performers Festival (sometimes known as StreetFest) is an annual, 10-day performance festival that takes place in mid-July at Sir Winston Churchill Square, in the city of Edmonton, Alberta, Canada. The festival was founded in 1985 by Sheldon Wilner and Dick Finkel with the intention of bringing the art of street performance to Edmonton’s downtown region. Every year, the festival brings in performers from around the world, and gives an opportunity for local performers to showcase their talent. In 2014, the festival featured roughly 1500 performances, and was attended by 250,000 people.

Over the years, StreetFest has hosted a wide variety of performers, such as famous high-wire artist Phillip Petite, Cirque du Soleil clown Michael Hancock, and a variety of other clowns, acrobats, jugglers and magicians. The festival is somewhat unique in that the majority of the income that the artists receive for their work during the festival comes not from the festival organizers, but from the goodwill of the audience. Hats are passed around after each performance, and audience members are encouraged, but not required, to tip the performer for their work.

In addition to traditional outdoor shows, the festival is also known for its encouragement of artistic collaboration. The "Troupe de Jour" program brings select artists together every night during the festival for an original variety show that combines the unique talents of the performers involved. "Late Night Madness" is a festival-wide night of collaboration where individual artists are invited to work together to come up with their own show. "Be Your Own Busker" is an educational series aimed at teaching both children and adults some of the basics of street performance, like juggling and making balloon animals.

No festival was held in 2020.

== History ==
From 1981 to 1985, Edmonton International Street Performers Festival founders Sheldon Wilner and Dick Finkel ran an initiative called "Summerfest", which was a loose collection of summer cultural events that aimed to make summers in Edmonton more interesting. Many of Edmonton's present-day festivals can trace their roots back to Summerfest, including the Edmonton International Street Performers Festival.

In 1985, the festival's inaugural year, there were 20 artists spread across Edmonton's downtown region. It was the first attempt at such a festival in Canada. While attendance wasn't high, this first festival sparked a great deal of interest in the community, and it was decided that the festival would continue into the next year.

Wilner left the following year in 1986, but Finkel stayed on as the festival's producer, a role he would hold until 1999.

In 1987, StreetFest centralised and hosted all of its artists in Sir Winston Churchill Square, where the festival is still held today. This proved fruitful, as it brought the visiting artists into closer proximity to one another, and the next year, in 1988, many of the performers got together to throw an impromptu variety show called "Late Night Madness," a tradition that has continued ever since, except 2020.

== See also ==
- Festivals in Edmonton
- Festivals in Alberta
