= HarvestMoon Music and Arts Festival =

Music and arts festival in Edmonton, Alberta, Canada

Harvestmoon Festival is an annual celebration of music and arts situated in Edmonton, Alberta, Canada. Usually the second weekend of September, the festival showcases different genres of music—both international and local—with heavy representation by Tooth and Nail artists. On the arts side, the festival exhibits various pieces of artwork based on a predetermined theme from local up-and-coming individuals.

Some of the highlights from (2005) include Anberlin, Project 86, Thousand Foot Krutch, and Mutemath.

(2006) was Harvestmoon Festival's tenth anniversary and final event since it ran out of funding unfortunately. The festival ran September 8, 9, and 10. Some of the highlights include Blindside, Stutterfly, and MxPx.

== See also ==
- List of festivals in Edmonton
- List of festivals in Alberta
- List of music festivals in Canada
