= Rainbow Visions Film Festival =

LGBTQ film festival in Alberta, Canada

- Locations: Edmonton, Canada
- Next event: June 18, 2026 - June 21, 2026
- Website: rainbowvisions.ca

The Rainbow Visions Film Festival is an annual film festival in Edmonton, Alberta, which presents an annual program of LGBT film.

== History ==
Launched in 2015 by Global Visions Festival Society, the organizers of the city's Northwestfest (formerly known as "Global Visions") documentary film festival, the event is staged in the fall each year at the city's Garneau Theatre.

Its creation followed the demise of the city's former LGBT film festival, Queer Sightings.

== Past Winners ==
The festival's winners are voted by the audience.

=== 2018 ===
Winner: The Fruit Machine

1st Runner-up: Tucked

2nd Runner-up: Man Made

=== 2019 ===
==== Documentary Category ====
Winner: Changing the Game

Runner-up: Gay Chorus Deep South

==== Narrative Category ====
Winner: Straight Up

Runner-up: The Garden Left Behind

=== 2021 ===
Best Feature Film: Firebird

Best Short Film: Before the Eruption

Best Documentary Feature: Raw! Uncut! Video!

== See also ==
- List of LGBT film festivals
- List of film festivals in Canada
