= Roxy Theatre (Saskatoon) =

Cinema in Saskatoon, Saskatchewan, Canada

- The Roxy
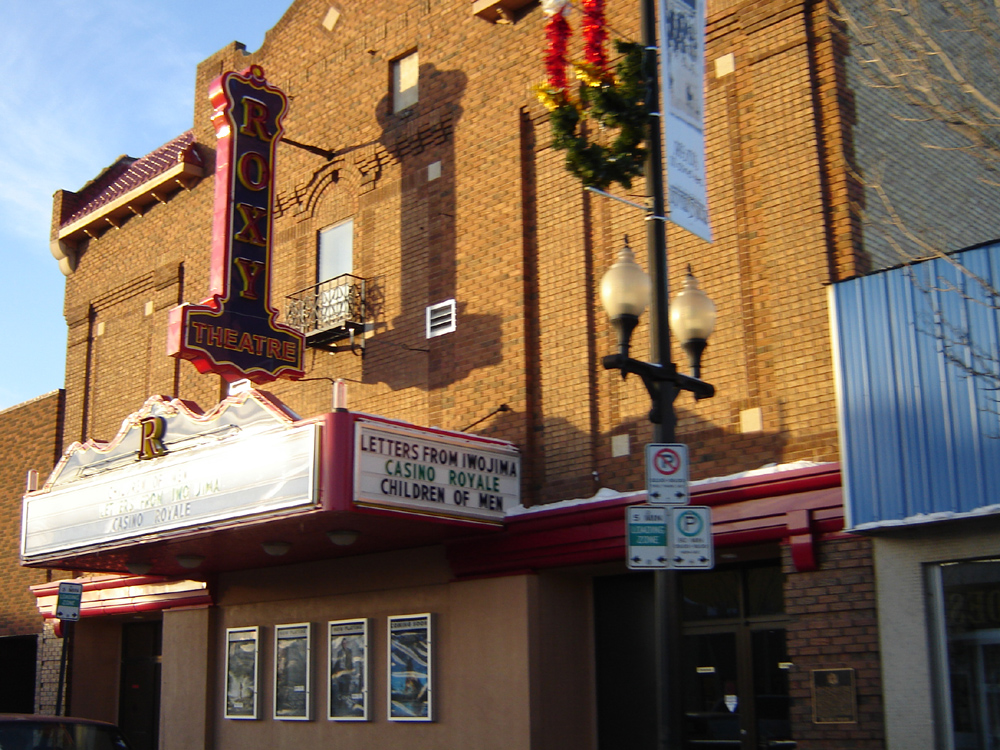
- Interactive map of Roxy Theatre
- Former names: Towne Cinema, Coronet Theatre
- Coordinates: 52.126345°N 106.674202°W
- Owner: Rainbow Cinemas
- Seating type: fixed
- Capacity: 478 (main screen); 140 (second screen)
- Type: Movie Palace
- Events: Films and Stage shows

Construction
- Built: 1930

Website
- http://www.rainbowcinemas.ca/about.php?theatre=Roxy_Theatre

The Roxy Theatre is a movie theatre (cinema) in the Riversdale neighborhood of Saskatoon, Saskatchewan, Canada, built during the onset of the Great Depression.

The interior is decorated in a Spanish Villa style with the walls covered with small balconies, windows and towers, giving the impression of a quaint Spanish village. The ceiling was painted dark blue, with twinkling lights set in the plaster, to give the impression of a night sky. It was built for sound pictures ("talkies"), and was Saskatoon's first air-conditioned building. It is one of the last remaining atmospheric movie palaces in Canada.

== Naming, history ==
The New York Roxy, the largest cinema ever built in North America (demolished in 1960), was named after its manager, noted radio personality and impresario "Roxy" Rothafel. The word came to mean the latest and best in showmanship, inspiring hundreds of similarly named but unrelated theatres across North America. Rothstein Theatres of Winnipeg, who built the Roxy in Saskatoon, used the name for many of their locations.

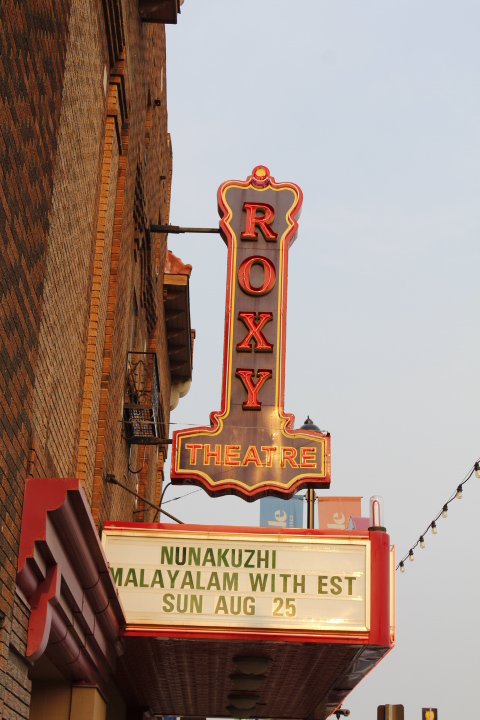
Signage at the theatre

In 1974 the theatre was sold to Rokemay Theatres, which owned it until 2005. It was leased to Odeon for a period in the 1960s and early 1970s when it was named in the Coronet. When Rokemay began operation, it was called the Towne Cinema. A second screen was added on May 30, 1980, in a separate building. It was leased to and operated by Cineplex Odeon from 1986 to 1995. The Towne then closed in 1995, and sat vacant until it was purchased by Rainbow Cinemas.

== Restoration ==
The theatre was purchased and restored by Rainbow and Magic Lantern Cinemas, and reopened under its original name in 2005. It currently shows first-run art and alternative movies, and is a venue for concerts, lectures, and a variety of community events.
