= Club 70 =

Gay private club in Edmonton, Canada (1970–1978)

Coordinates: 53.541881°N 113.490709°W

Club 70, which operated from 1970 to 1978, was the first private members club for gays and lesbians in Edmonton, Canada. It was also the first formally established gay bar in the city. Before it opened, 2SLGBTQ people often met at house parties, parks or public bathrooms.

== History ==
Club 70 was first located on 101 St. and 106 Ave., in the basement of a Greek restaurant. When the owner realised that gay people were meeting there, he evicted them. Because personal information of the members, such as names and addresses, had been left in the building, a few members broke in to remove them and prevent their members from being outed. Only gays and lesbians were allowed to be members, and bringing a straight guest lead to a 30-day suspension.

The club reopened a month later on 102 Ave. and 106 St., where it hosted themed nights and performances which were advertised in the Club 70 News newspaper, which also published more political articles. Several famous drag queens including Millie performed there. There were often incidents of homophobic violence outside the club. Because of the difficulty in obtaining a liquor license, the club could only serve alcohol a few nights a week. Patrons recall that the police frequently checked the premises to ensure that there was no liquor on dry nights.

In the late 1970s, the club was also used as a drop in centre by the Gay Alliance Toward Equality (GATE). It closed in 1978 due to financial struggles and the availability of other bars like Flashback and The Roost. The independent art gallery Latitude 53 now occupies the building.

== See also ==
- List of LGBTQ bars
