= Lillian Shirt =

Cree activist

Lillian Shirt (born Lillian Piché; March 2, 1940 – July 18, 2017) was a Cree women's rights activist from Saddle Lake Cree Nation in Treaty 6 Territory, Alberta, Canada who was known for her political initiative against the discrimination towards Indigenous women and their inadequate access to housing, employment, and human rights.

== Activism ==
In 1969, Shirt protested on the grounds of Sir Winston Churchill Square outside Edmonton City Hall after she and her children were unjustly evicted from their apartment following a change in ownership. With nowhere else to go, and no landlord willing to rent to her, she set up a tipi for her and her 4 children to live in view of the mayor's office. During the protest, which lasted 12 days, she was joined by several others who set up tents and an additional tipi.

The protest earned national media attention. In an interview, Shirt explained that, along with housing discrimination, there were other reasons for her protest including child welfare, increased opportunities for education, and a need to address alcohol abuse in Indigenous communities. Shirt met with Edmonton Mayor Ivor Dent and Alberta Premier Harry Strom to outline the social injustices the Indigenous women in her community were facing. She was promised that programs would be put in place to address these issues, and the province's plan for welfare housing began.

In 1973, during several demonstrations, Shirt was also active in protesting the ruling in the Lavell case, where a group of Indigenous women staged a demonstration in front of the legislative buildings in Edmonton. They protested the Lavell decision and demand equality, not only for Indigenous women, but for Indigenous peoples as well.

Shirt went on to become one of the pioneering Indigenous activists of her time. She established the Alberta Native Peoples Defence Fund, now commonly known as the Alberta Litigation Fund, and contributed to the organization of the Sacred Circle program at Prince Charles Elementary School, launching an initiative to teach Cree language in schools. Shirt also helped found the organization Indian Rights for Indian Women, along with Mohawk rights activist Mary Two-Axe Earley. Additionally, she fought to address sex discrimination in the Indian Act, ultimately ending with the passing of Bill C-31 in 1985.

== Death ==
Shirt died at the age of 77 on July 18, 2017. She was survived by her 6 children, 31 grandchildren, 35 great-grandchildren, and her numerous traditionally adopted children and grandchildren.
