= Neon Sign Museum =

Sign museum in Edmonton, Canada

Coordinates: 53°32′46″N 113°29′56″W

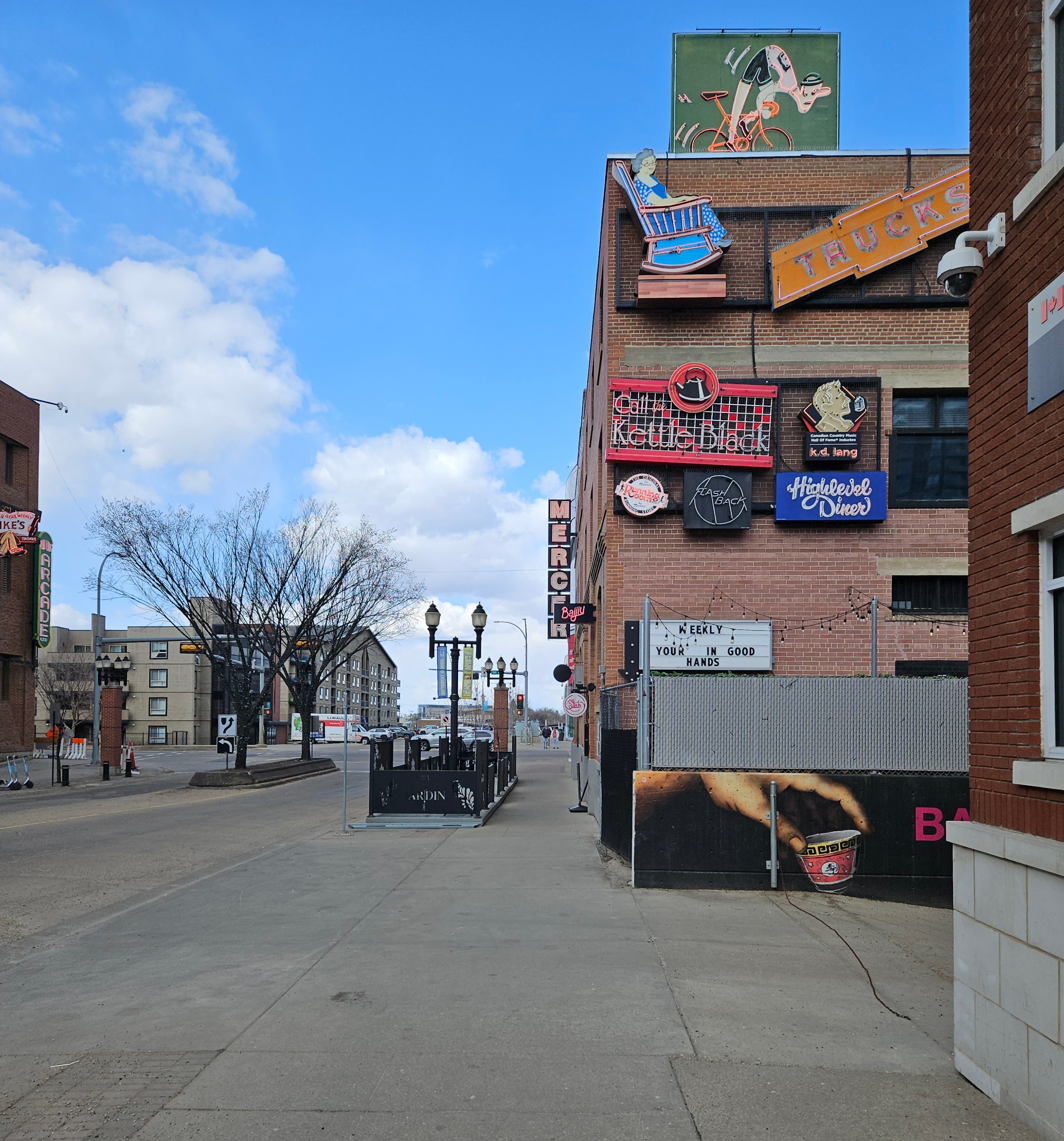
The eastern part of the Neon Sign Museum along the Mercer Warehouse, including signs for k.d. lang and the Flashback Gay Bar

The Neon Sign Museum is an outdoor collection of historical neon signs found in Downtown Edmonton, Canada. The first of its kind in Canada, the museum is found along 104 Street south of 104 Avenue, in the Warehouse District and just south of the Ice District.

== History ==
The museum's signs were largely donated or recovered by the city from defunct Edmonton businesses. The first to be acquired was a Canadian Furniture sign that a city heritage planner David Holdsworth recovered in 2002. More and more signs were acquired through time, including an iconic Mike's News sign donated to the City of Edmonton's Artifacts Centre, until in 2012 there were enough to open a museum, which would form part of a broader revitalization plan for the Warehouse district. Signs were refurbished by the Alberta Sign Association and various private partners, including Blanchett Neon and Skyline Sign Services. The museum opened in 2014 with eight signs. As of 2016, the City of Edmonton had spent around $250,000 to launch the museum.

== Displays ==
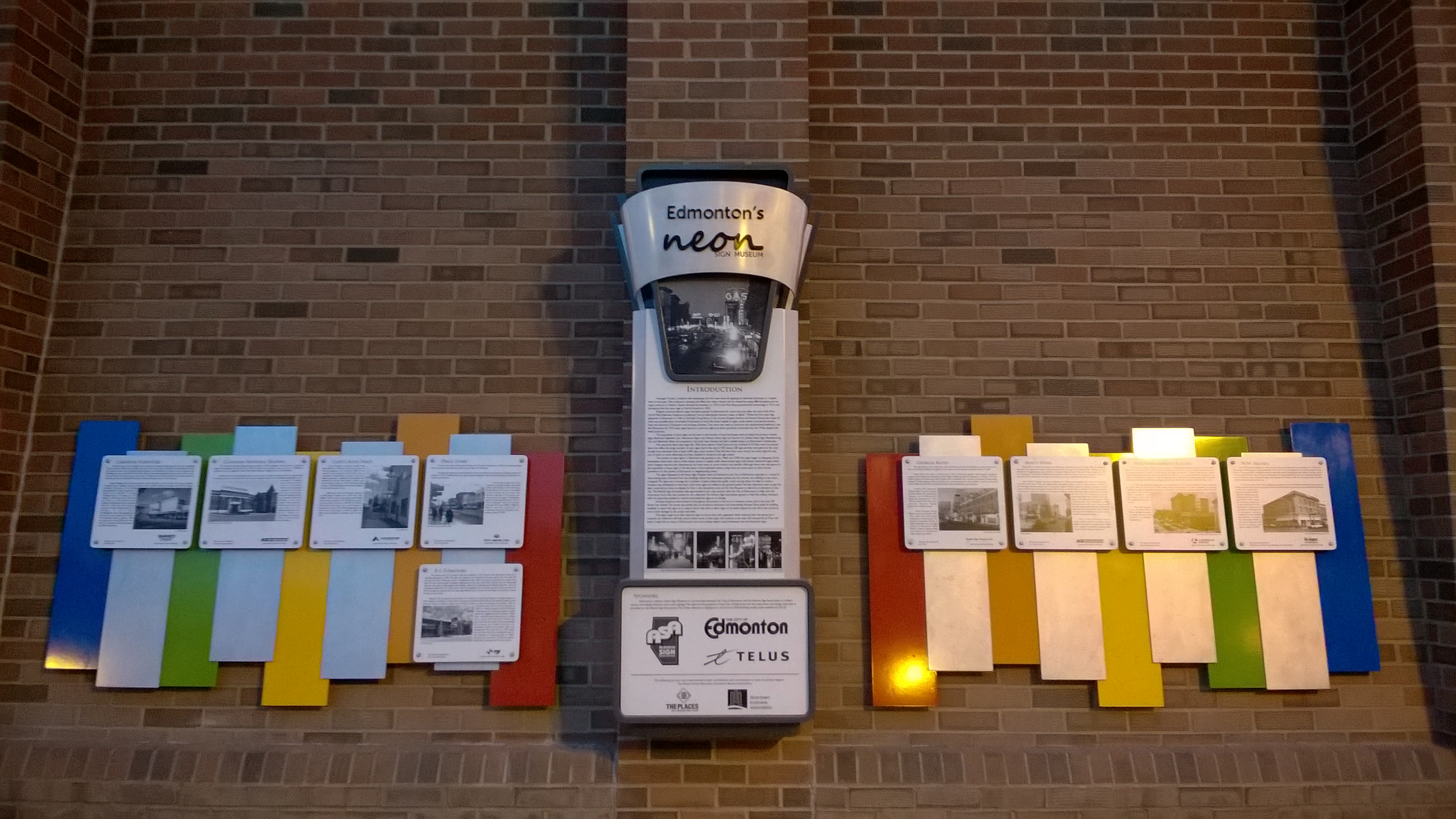
Placards along the TELUS telephone exchange building.

The museum was established along a brick wall on a building used by TELUS as a telephone exchange. Over time, the collection more than doubled, and the museum expanded into the south face of the Mercer Warehouse across the street. The museum has capacity for about 30 signs in total. TELUS and The Mercer donate the power to light the signs, and the costs and labour to transplant and restore them is generally donated by companies that belong to the Alberta Sign Association. The City of Edmonton provides a modest ongoing maintenance budget.

The oldest sign in the collection, for Darling's Drug Store, dates to 1928. Although most of the signs are historical, a new sign was commissioned to commemorate k.d. lang's induction into the Canadian Country Music Hall of Fame and hung close to that of the Flashback Gay Bar, where lang once performed. Placards at the street level explain the historical significance and context of each sign.
