= Carnival of Shrieking Youth =

Theatre festival in Edmonton, Alberta

The Carnival Of Shrieking Youth is a theatre festival for young artists in Edmonton, Alberta. The festival was founded in 1993 by Scott Sharplin and has been run by longtime artistic director Karl Schreiner since 1998. The festival started as "a week of plays written, directed and performed by youth graduates of the Citadel Theatre's Teen Festival of the Arts"—according to coverage of the festival's first season. It has since become independent from Citadel Theatre, producing the plays of young playwrights from the Edmonton area, and starring young actors and directors from the city.
