= Rainbow and Magic Lantern Cinemas =

Canadian Cinéma chain

- Industry: Movie theatres
- Founded: 1984; 42 years ago in Edmonton, Alberta
- Headquarters: Canada
- Website: Official Website

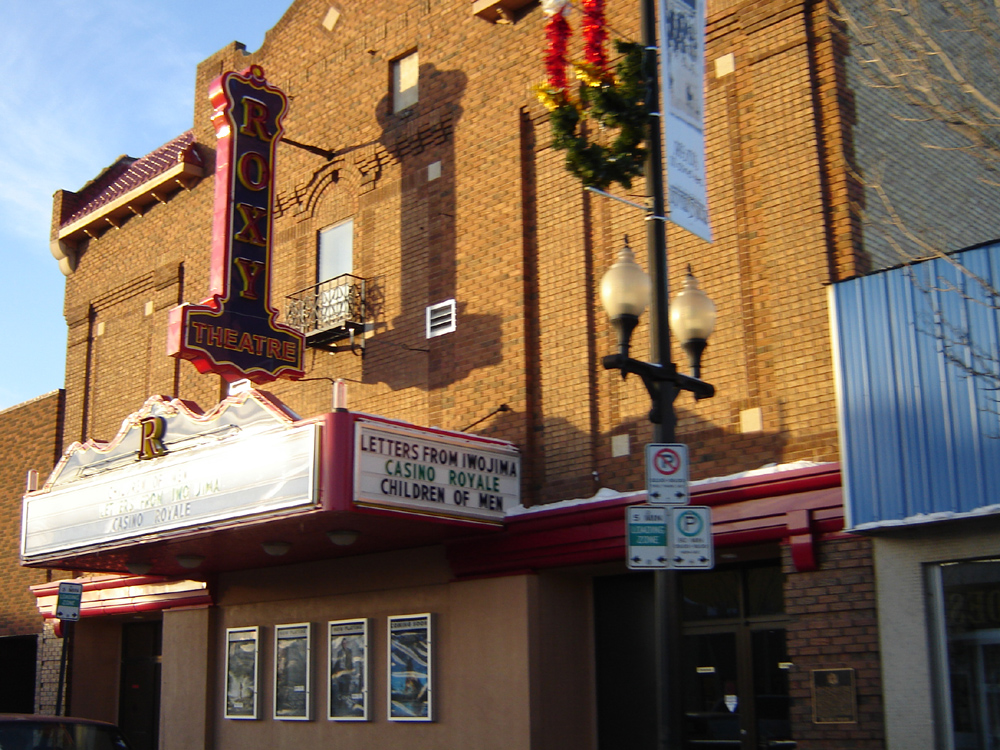
Roxy Theatre located in Saskatoon

Magic Lantern Theatres is a chain of 10 movie theatres in Canada. Three of these locations are Rainbow Cinemas discount theatres. Magic Lantern Theatres was founded in 1984 in Edmonton, Alberta, while Rainbow Cinemas was founded in the early 1990s in Saskatoon, Saskatchewan. The two chains merged and are now based in Edmonton. In May 2016, a strategic decision was made to sell all of the Ontario cinemas to Imagine Cinemas, except for the Cobourg location. Magic Lantern and Rainbow operate 43 screens, and the combination is the fourth largest movie chain across Canada behind Cineplex Entertainment, Landmark Cinemas and Imagine Cinemas.

== Locations ==
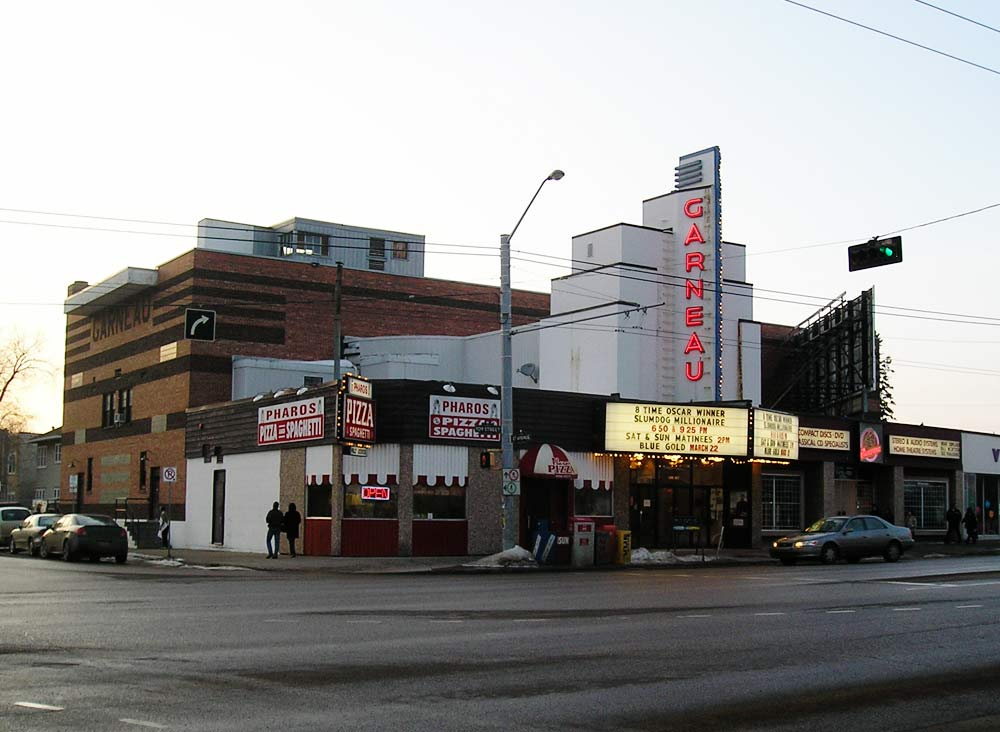
Garneau Theatre located in Edmonton, formerly managed by Magic Lantern Cinemas

The chain currently operates Rainbow Cinemas theatres in Cobourg, and Magic Lantern Theatres in Camrose, Peace River, St. Paul, Whitecourt, Fort Saskatchewan, Yorkton, North Battleford, Meadow Lake and Dawson Creek. Magic Lantern was responsible for restoring the interior of the formerly derelict Garneau Theatre, near the University of Alberta in Edmonton. It managed this location until June 2011, when its exterior was restored and the theatre was taken over by Metro Cinema Edmonton, a local nonprofit.

In 2010, the company acquired the Carlton Cinemas theatre in downtown Toronto, a historic venue for independent and arthouse films which was closed by Cineplex Odeon in fall 2009. The theatre reopened as part of the Magic Lantern chain on June 30, 2010 with a two-day program of free films, including Crazy Heart, Chloe, A Single Man, Departures, Julie and Julia, Away from Her and Fantastic Mr. Fox. This theatre is now operated by Imagine Cinemas.

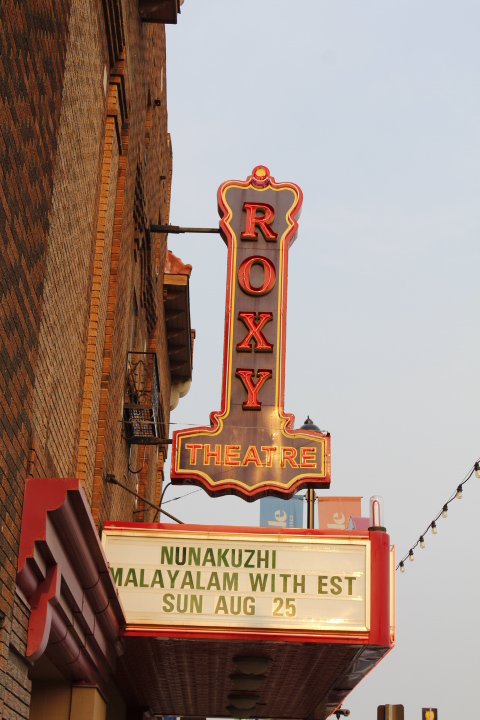
Signage at Magic Lantern Theatres

In October 2013, the company acquired the Elgin Mills Cinemas theatre in Richmond Hill. The theatre was previously owned by Cineplex Odeon from its opening in 1995 to September 30, 2005 when it was bought by Empire Theatres. When Empire Theatres announced that it was selling all their theatres to Cineplex Entertainment and Landmark Cinemas, this theatre was not one of them, so the location closed on August 15, 2013 when its lease expired. The theatre reopened on November 20, 2013. In 2016, it was taken over by Imagine Cinemas.

In late-2016, Magic Lantern announced preliminary plans to build what was to be another first-run theatre in the Brighton neighbourhood of Saskatoon. However, the project was acquired from Magic Lantern by Landmark Cinemas. It was also announced in May 2018 that Rainbow's cinema at The Centre in Saskatoon would close in 2020, as it was denied a lease renewal due to a new Cineplex theatre being constructed on the property, complementing that chain's flagship Scotiabank Theatre Saskatoon location.
