= Taste of Edmonton =

Annual festival in Canada

Coordinates: 53°32′39″N 113°29′24″W

- Genre: Food festival
- Dates: 11 days, ending last weekend of July
- Locations: Churchill Square, Edmonton, Alberta
- Years active: 41
- Founded: 1984
- Patrons: 350,000
- Website: Taste of Edmonton

Taste of Edmonton is an annual outdoor festival held in Edmonton, Alberta. It is the largest food and entertainment festival in Western Canada, welcoming more than 350,000 attendees together to sample the best local restaurants, chefs, food trucks, and alcoholic beverages - and to stay for an all-Canadian concert series.

The festival was chosen as Edmonton's Favourite Festival in 2018 by PostMedia readers and a finalist for Tourism Event or Festival of the Year for the 2019 Alberta Tourism Awards.

Affected by COVID-19, there was no festival in 2020.

== See also ==
- Festivals in Alberta
