= Metro Cinema Edmonton =

Coordinates: 53°31′23.5″N 113°30′44″W

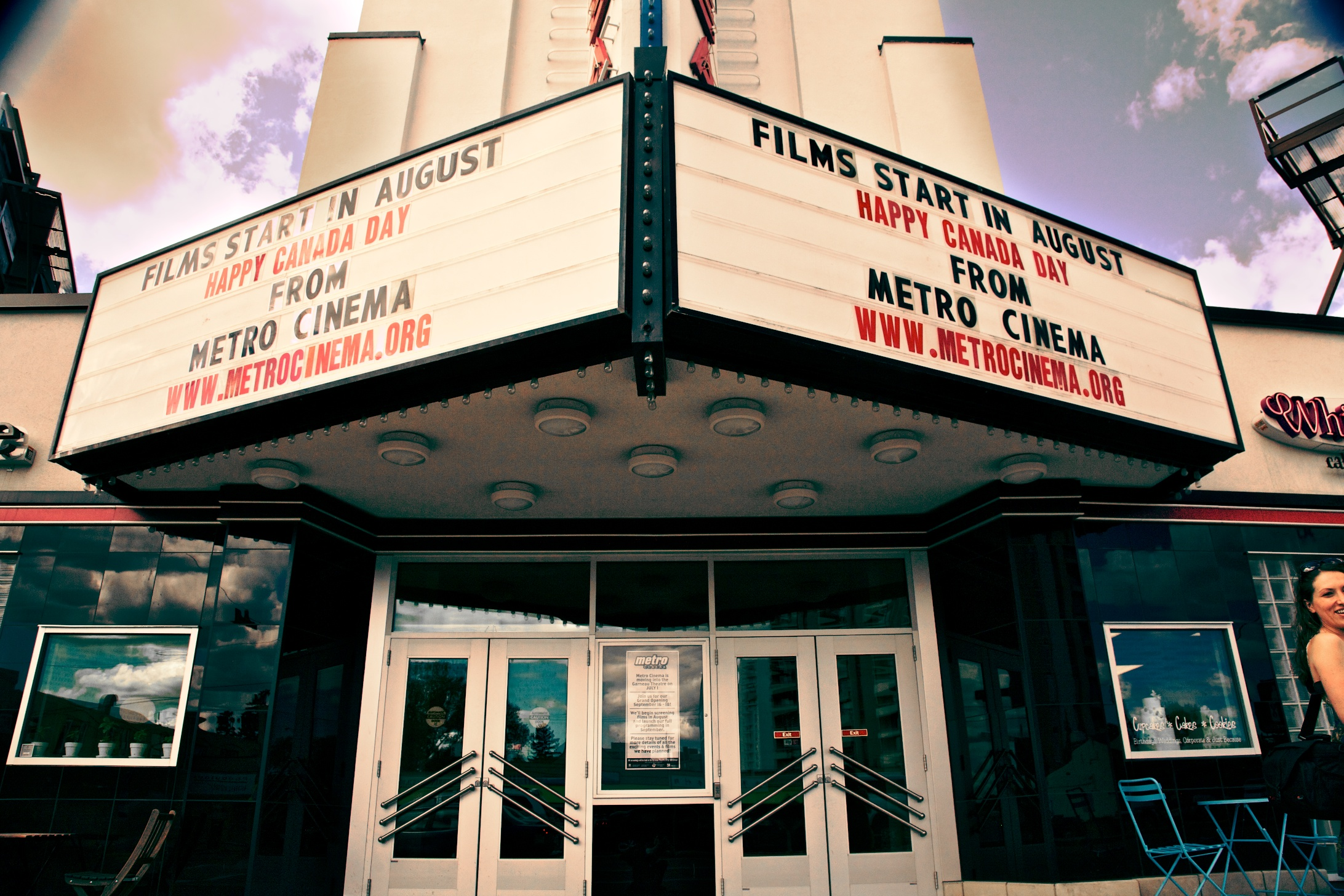
Metro Cinema in 2011

Metro Cinema Edmonton is an independent cinema and non-profit organization in Edmonton, Alberta. Since 2011, Metro Cinema has operated out of the Garneau Theatre in the Strathcona district of Edmonton. Prior to that it operated out of the Zeidler Hall in the Citadel Theatre in downtown Edmonton.

Metro Cinema is funded by: Canadian Council for the Arts, Alberta Foundation for the Arts, Alberta Arts Council, The City of Edmonton, and Alberta Media Arts Alliance Society (AMAAS).

Starting in March 2020, Metro Cinema began virtual screenings due to closure of theaters as a result of the COVID-19 pandemic.
