= Edmonton Short Film Festival =

Canadian film festival

The Edmonton Short Film Festival (ESFF) is a Film festival hosted annually in Edmonton, Alberta, Canada. It was created in 2013 by Groove-Soldier Productions, an independent film production company in Edmonton founded by Daniel Foreman and Sharlene Millang-Borst. The goal was to provide a venue for other local, independent filmmakers to have their projects screened for their friends and family in a professional setting, celebrating their work with other like-minded people. Over 250 minutes of film was submitted to this inaugural festival and the coordinators chose 18 projects to screen. This inaugural event was well attended (the 250-seat theatre was sold out), so in 2014, the festival was incorporated as a non-profit “Edmonton Short Film Festival Ltd” (ESFF). 2015 marked the third anniversary of ESFF and was celebrated at the Royal Alberta Museum.

The festival is held in the Fall each year and primarily screens short films made by independent filmmakers from Alberta. Initially the festival was a single day event, then in 2016 another day was added that focused on family films. In 2019, the second day of the festival was changed to focuses on short films made by international filmmakers from around the world, rather than family oriented short films. In 2022, the 10th anniversary was held at the Metro Cinema and the festival was awarded a special proclamation from Edmonton Mayor Sohi celebrating the milestone. The following year, a third day was added to the Gala Weekend to bring in talented Albertan filmmakers, actors, and stunt people for educational events. A new program was introduced in 2024 called the Film Career Development Program, which aims to provide opportunities to under-represented communities looking to pursue careers in the film industry.

== List of Events ==
In addition to the annual fall festival, the ESFF also programs workshops, events, and community screenings throughout the year.

- Red Carpet Gala: Every October, the main program for the festival features short films from a variety of genres, including music videos, trailers, and commercials from Albertan filmmakers. Awards are given out in 11 genre categories and a special People's Choice cash award.
- Long Shorts/International: On the second day of the festival's main program, ESFF showcases short films from filmmakers outside the province, and from different countries.
- Pop-Up Community Screenings: Since 2020, ESFF hosts several community screenings throughout the year corresponding to different holidays, including Black History Month, Pride Month, National Day for Truth & Reconciliation, Metis Week, Canada's National Indigenous History Month, and partnering with other film festivals to bring short films to new audiences.
- Workshops: ESFF hosts workshops to teach filmmaking skills, as well as host industry panel talks with professionals in the film industry.
- 48 Hr Mobile Device Filmmaking Challenge: ESFF hosts an annual film-making challenge that asks participants to write, shoot, and edit a short film in 48 hours.
- Film Career Development Program: ESFF selects a group of filmmakers to serve as mentors to provide hands-on experience for under-represented communities. Each mentee is assigned a role and mentor on the film crew.
- Alberta Screenwriter Accelerator Program: In 2022, ESFF launched the Alberta Screenwriters Accelerator Program which awards the prize winner the funding and support to produce their script into a professional short film.
