= Roxy Theatre (Edmonton) =

Theatre in Edmonton, Alberta, Canada

Coordinates: 53°33′4″N 113°32′9″W

Roxy Theatre, also known as The Roxy, is a live-action performance theatre located in Edmonton, Alberta, Canada. It was originally designated as a movie theatre, but was eventually converted into a live-action performance venue.

The original theatre opened on October 13, 1938 and was destroyed by a fire on January 13, 2015. A new theatre was constructed and opened in its original location on April 14, 2022.

== Early history ==
The original theatre was designed by William G. Blakey and built by I.F.Shacker of Hanna. It was managed by Bill Wilson, the son of a Famous Players theatre manager. It was considered luxurious for its time as it had air conditioning, spring seating, and extra legroom.

In 1941, the theatre was leased to Odeon Theatres of Canada. After Odeon's lease ran out, the cinema was operated as a part of Inner City Cinemas along with the Avenue Theatre and Varscona Theatre. Inner City Cinemas ran a calendar program that ran movies for three days first at one, then the next, then the next cinema. Famous Players leased all 3 theatres from Inner City, which ended their unique venture. When Famous gave up the lease, the Roxy became The $2 Roxy, operating as a discount theatre with all shows $2, operated by Magic Lantern Theatres, which also had their offices in the retail space in the front of the building.

In 1989, the building was taken over by the Theatre Network and converted to a live-theatre venue.

== Fire and rebuilding ==
A fire at the theatre was called in to the Edmonton Fire Department just before 4am on January 13, 2015. Firefighters were unable to control the blaze and the building was destroyed. As of June 2015, the cause of the fire remains unknown. The Theatre Network had planned to open a new show the night of the fire and had to find alternate venues for its shows.

More than seven years after the fire, a new CA$12 million theatre reopened in its original location on April 14, 2022. The new building includes the 90-seat Lorne Cardinal Theatre and the 200-seat Nancy Power Theatre, as well as an art gallery and rehearsal space. The inaugural show was a run of Cliff Cardinal's The Land Acknowledgement, or As You Like It. As of 2025, a portion of the south wall remained incomplete because the company was denied an easement for access from the neighboring property. The neighboring building's owner filed a lawsuit alleging that the building's foundation was damaged during the construction of the Roxy.
