= Northwestfest =

Annual film festival in Edmonton, Canada

Northwestfest is an annual Canadian film festival in Edmonton, Alberta, which programs a lineup of documentary films. Organized by Global Visions Festival Society, the event is staged annually at the Garneau Theatre.

Originally launched in 1983 by the Edmonton Learners Centre, the event was known as the Third World Film Festival and concentrated primarily on documentary films about international development. It was rebranded as the Global Visions Film Festival in 1998, expanding its focus to a wider selection of documentary films, and it adopted its current name in 2015.

The event is a qualifying festival for the Canadian Screen Awards.
