= Churchill Square (Edmonton) =

Square in Edmonton, Canada

- City square
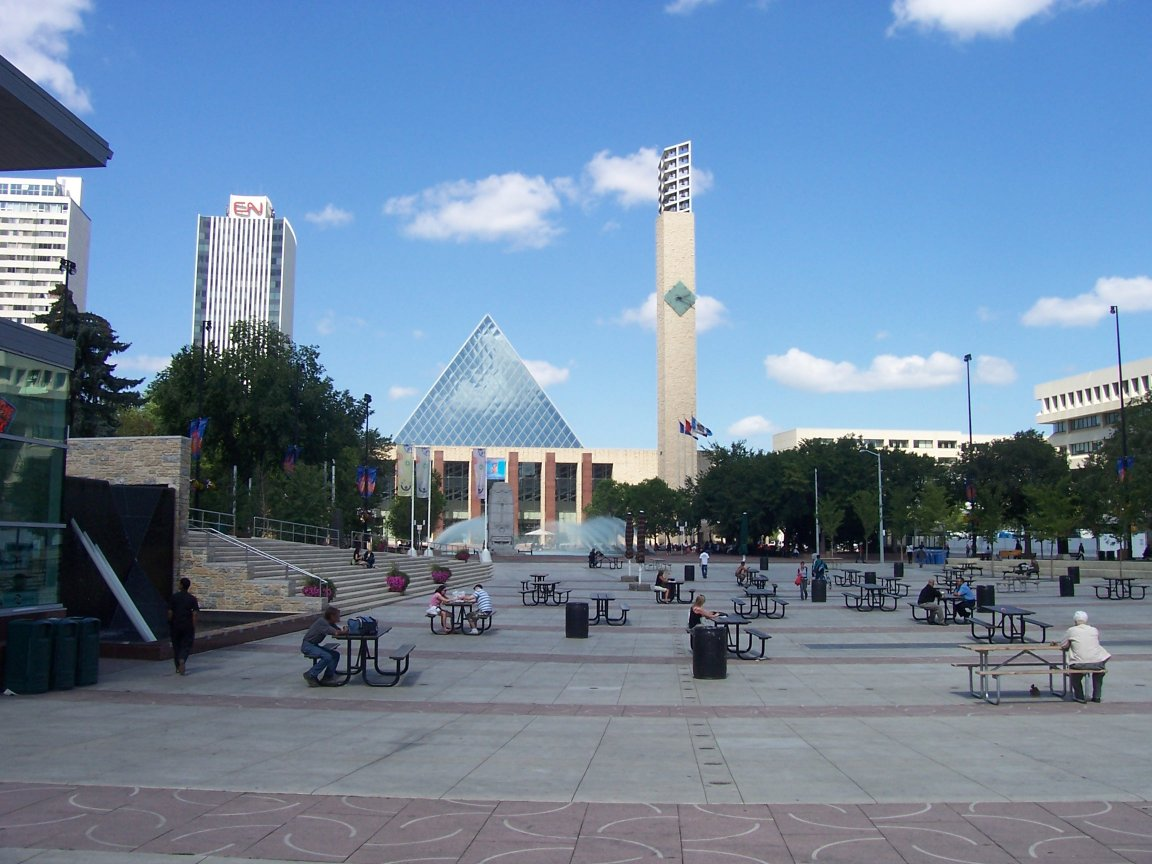
- Churchill Square looking towards City Hall
- Features: amphitheatre
- Surface: paving stones
- Dedicated to: Sir Winston Churchill
- Owner: City of Edmonton
- Location: Edmonton, Alberta, Canada
- Location of Churchill Square in Edmonton
- Coordinates: 53°32′38″N 113°29′23″W

Churchill Square (officially "Sir Winston Churchill Square") is the main downtown square in Edmonton, Alberta, which plays host to a large number of festivals and events including: the Edmonton International Street Performers Festival, Edmonton Fashion Week, The Works Art & Design Festival, Taste of Edmonton, Cariwest, and Edmonton Pride.

== Site ==
It is bordered on the north by 102A Avenue, on the west by 100 Street, on the south by Harbin Road (102 Avenue) and on the east by Rue Hull (99) Street. In 2009, 102A Avenue was closed to vehicle traffic permanently, providing easier pedestrian access to City Hall.

Surrounding the square are several cultural and governmental buildings, including Edmonton City Hall to the north, the Law Courts and the Art Gallery of Alberta to the north-east, Chancery Hall and the Francis Winspear Centre for Music to the east, the Citadel Theatre to the south-east, the Stanley A. Milner Library (the main branch of Edmonton Public Library) to the south and Edmonton City Centre mall to the west.

The centrepiece of the square builds a life-size bronze statue of Winston Churchill, unveiled by Lady Soames on May 24, 1989. It is a copy of a statue made by Oscar Nemon.

== History ==
Historically, Edmonton's main square was Market Square, located just to the south of Churchill Square, on the site of the present Milner Library. the square into a civic centre, beginning in 1912. A building was built far away on 107 Avenue for the market to be moved indoors in November 1914, but was never used for this purpose and was boycotted by vendors and customers. The market returned to its original location and the city agreed to help construct a shelter. Beginning in 1915 the market was moved indoors, and by 1920 only overflow stalls were outside. From 1916, when the shelter was built, to 1965, when it moved off the site, the market flourished as the hub of Edmonton life. The City Market was finally shifted east to 97 Street, and the area was redeveloped according to a plan to create a "civic centre" in the area by constructing the new art gallery and library to accompany the new city hall which had been built in 1957.

In 1969, Lillian Shirt drew national media attention for protesting housing discrimination by erecting a tipi on the square. During the protest, which lasted 12 days, was joined by several others who set up tents and an additional tipi.

Churchill Square has undergone several face-lifts, the most recent, expensive, and most controversial, being completed in 2004, in time for Edmonton's Centennial Celebrations. These renovations saw the removal of a large amount of green space, as well as the building of several new structures in the square including an amphitheatre, a waterfall, as well as several structures for retail space (currently occupied by the Three Bananas Cafe and Tix on the Square).

== Transportation ==
Churchill Square is well served by the Edmonton Transit System, being located above Churchill LRT Station, and also near a bus transfer point at CN Tower. St. Albert Transit and Strathcona County Transit also run three bus routes each (StAT routes 201, 202 & 211 & SCT routes 401, 411, & 413) past Churchill Square.

== Surrounding buildings ==
Although Churchill Square is not the name of any street in Edmonton, and all the streets in the area are named, the square is used as the address for buildings facing it, they are numbered clockwise starting in the north.

| Full address | Building |
|---|---|
| 1 Sir Winston Churchill Square, Edmonton, T5J 2R7 | City Hall |
| 1a Sir Winston Churchill Square, Edmonton, T5J 0R2 | Law Courts |
| 2 Sir Winston Churchill Square, Edmonton, T5J 2C1 | Art Gallery of Alberta |
| 3 Sir Winston Churchill Square, Edmonton, T5J 2C3 | Chancery Hall |
| 4 Sir Winston Churchill Square, Edmonton, T5J 4X8 | Francis Winspear Centre for Music |
| 7 Sir Winston Churchill Square, Edmonton, T5J 2V4 | Stanley A. Milner Library |
| 9 Sir Winston Churchill Square, Edmonton, T5J 5B5 | Churchill Wire Centre |
| 15 Sir Winston Churchill Square, Edmonton, T5J 2E5 | Seniors Association of Greater Edmonton (SAGE) |

== See also ==
- List of city squares
