= Edmonton Riverboat =

Riverboat on the North Saskatchewan River, Canada

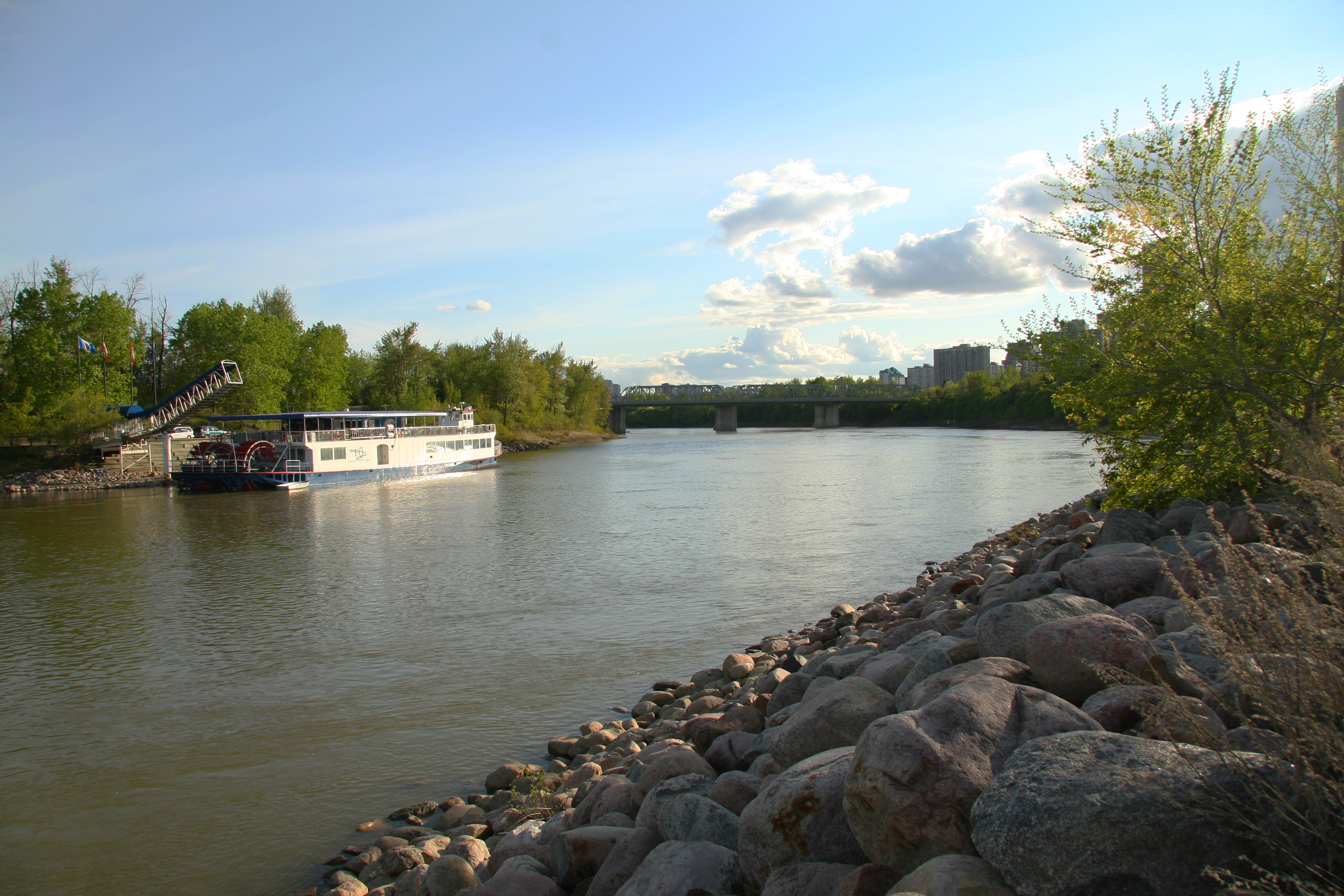
- Edmonton Queen

History

Canada
- Name: 1995–2018: Edmonton Queen; 2018 onwards: Edmonton Riverboat
- Port of registry: Edmonton, Alberta
- Builder: Scott Steel, Sherwood Park, Alberta; The Riverboat Corporation
- Laid down: 1992
- Completed: 1995
- In service: 26 July 1996
- Identification: IMO number: 8888886
- Status: In service

General characteristics
- Tonnage: 750.49 GT
- Length: 51.79 m (169 ft 11 in)
- Beam: 12.01 m (39 ft 5 in)
- Draft: 0.73 m (2 ft 5 in)
- Propulsion: 2 × 350 bhp (261 kW) Cummins NTA855 marine diesel engines; 2 × Paddlewheels @ 18 rpm; 1 × 192 hp (143 kW) Volvo Penta bow thruster
- Speed: 10 knots (19 km/h; 12 mph)
- Capacity: ~399 passengers
- Crew: 10

Edmonton Riverboat, formerly known as the Edmonton Queen, is a riverboat on the North Saskatchewan River in Edmonton, Alberta, Canada. The riverboat originally started to sail on the river under the name Edmonton Queen in 1995 and has become a unique Edmonton attraction. The Edmonton Riverboat is 52 metres (170 ft 7 in) long and configured to carry 399 passengers as of 2020. The Edmonton Riverboat primary operates during the summer months as the cold weather, variable river levels and the North Saskatchewan River is often iced-over throughout the winter.

== History ==
On 2 April 1992, Edmonton Mayor Jan Reimer would announce a CA$3.4-million venture partially funded by the federal and provincial government to build a dock for the proposed Edmonton Riverboat. Edmonton builder Scott Steel would construct the riverboat within the city, but would refuse to release the vessel, claiming he was owed $1.35-million.

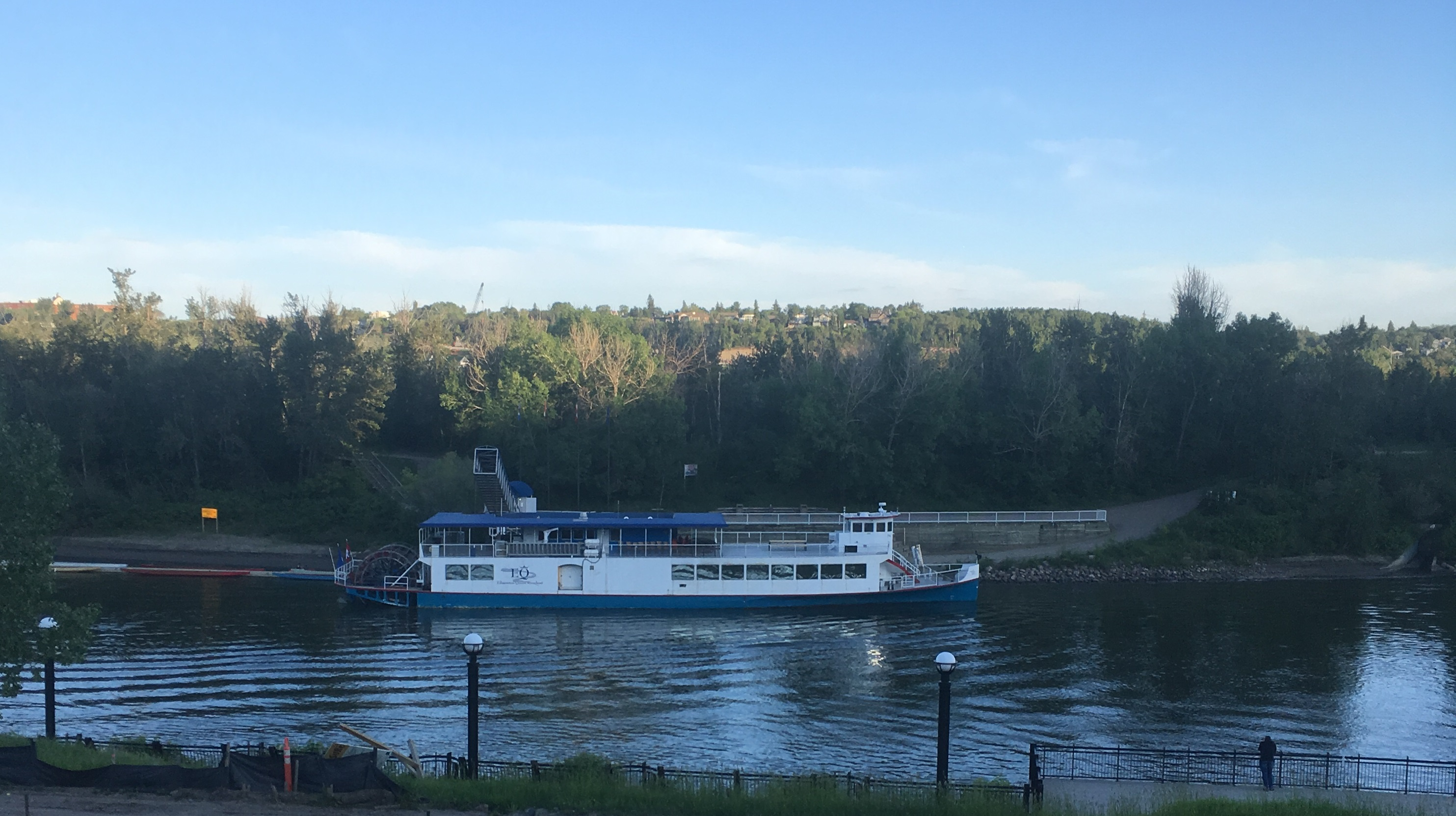
Edmonton Riverboat in 2018.

The riverboat was a lifelong dream of Edmonton businessmen Ray Collins who formed the North Saskatchewan Riverboat Company and prepared the boat. The North Saskatchewan Riverboat Company would fail before launching the Edmonton Queen, and the riverboat was subsequently sold to the development corporation Carrington Properties for CA$500,000 in early 1995. The Edmonton Queen would eventually be launched on the North Saskatchewan River on 4 May 1995.

In April 2016, the boat was sold in auction for $553,000 and underwent renovations, upgrades, and a change in name to Edmonton Riverboat.

The Edmonton Riverboat has had a number of grounding and weather incidents throughout its history. In July 2019, the boat became lodged on a sandbar. The 300 passengers on board were rescued by the Edmonton Fire Department. In April 2020, the boat was damaged after its hull was punctured by one of the underwater concrete pilings at dock due to rapid water level fluctuations from the spring thaw. In June 2020, the riverboat was dry-docked in Whitemud Park for repairs, which were completed in July 2022.

In May 2024, the boat was sold to two local couples for an undisclosed amount.
