= Imagine Cinemas =

Canadian movie theater chain

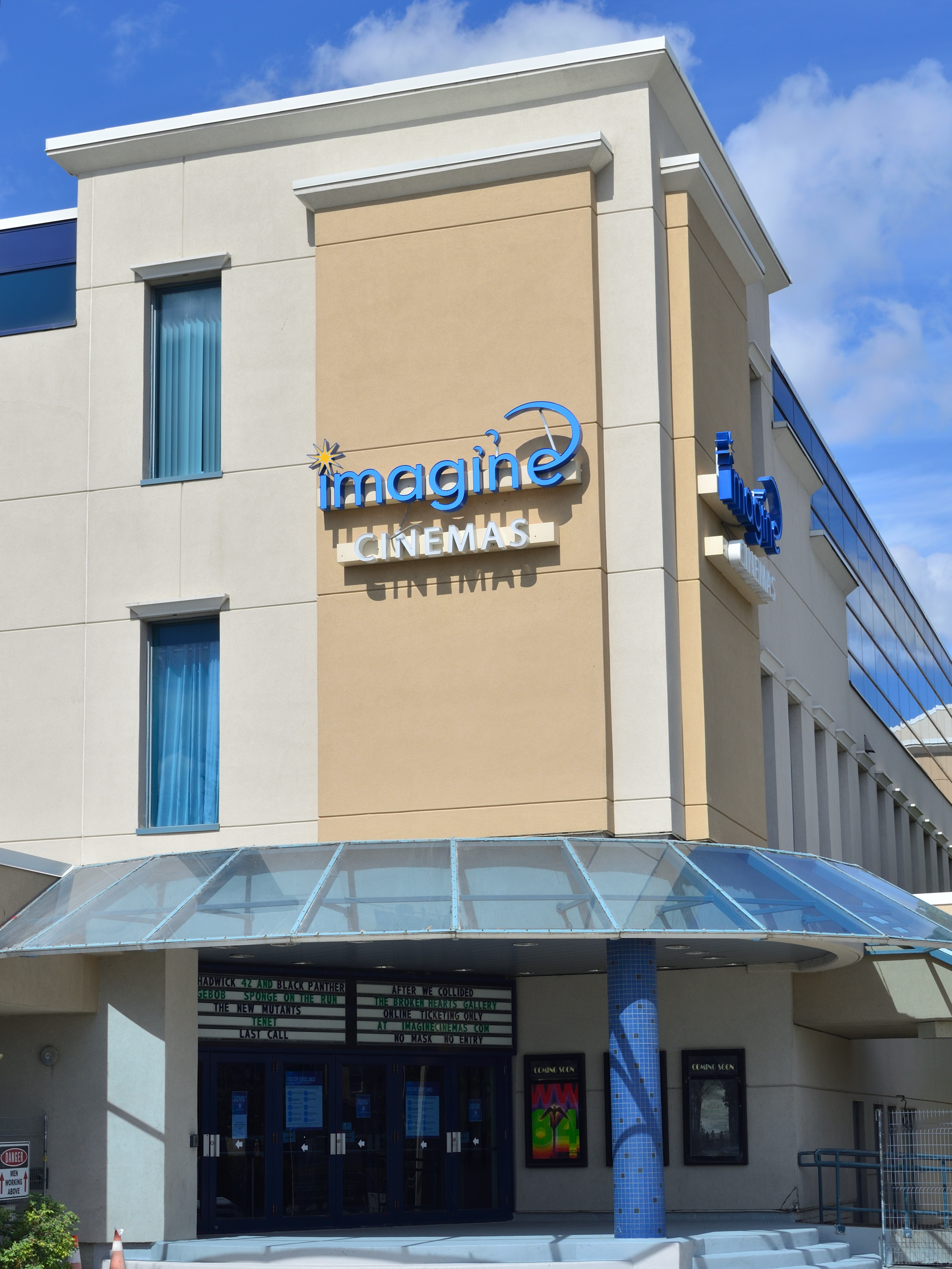
- Company type: Private
- Industry: Cinemas
- Predecessor: Rainbow Cinemas
- Founded: February 2, 2005; 21 years ago
- Headquarters: Canada
- Area served: Canada
- Key people: Greg Spencer; Gina Facca
- Website: imaginecinemas.com

Imagine Cinemas is an independently owned chain of cinemas, founded on February 2, 2005. The chain consists of 11 locations with a total of 72 screens in Ontario making it the third-largest movie theatre chain in Canada, outside of Quebec, and the largest independent Canadian-owned chain.

== History ==
On February 2, 2005, Imagine Cinemas opened its first theatre in Tecumseh, Ontario. They also bought The Palace Theatre in Windsor, Ontario but closed the facility in 2012.

In April 2014, Imagine announced the acquisition of Frederick Twin Cinemas in Kitchener, Ontario.

On May 27, 2016, Imagine announced the acquisition of seven theatres in Ontario formerly owned and operated by Rainbow Cinemas. The following year, they announced the opening a new theatre at the Alliston Mills Shopping Centre. On August 2, 2018, Quebec owned media company UB Media won the rights to represent sales for Landmark Cinemas Canada and Imagine.

October 30, 2019, they acquired Gem Theatre in Keswick, Ontario.

Whistler Village 8 Cinema was closed on Jan 6, 2023.
