= Garneau Theatre =

Cinema in Edmonton, Alberta, Canada

- The east face and main entrance of the theatre in 2026.
- Interactive map of Garneau Theatre
- Location: 8712 109 Street NW; Edmonton, Alberta, Canada; T6G 1E9
- Coordinates: 53°31′23″N 113°30′45″W
- Capacity: 527
- Designation: Municipal Historic Resource

Construction
- Years active: 1940–1990; 1991–present
- Architect: William Blakey

Stage with curtain drawn

Projectionist in the projection booth

The Garneau Theatre is a historic movie theatre located on 109 Street in Edmonton, Alberta, Canada. The theatre originally operated independently until it joined with Famous Players in 1941. It closed in late 1990, and reopened in December 1991 under Magic Lantern Theatres who restored it in 1996. Magic Lantern operated the Garneau until June 2011 when it closed. The Garneau became Metro Cinema's new home in July 2011, and was officially reopened in September 2011.

It was designated a Municipal Historic Resource on October 28, 2009.

Designed by noted Edmonton architect William Blakey and built in 1940, the Garneau is the only remaining theatre of the early modernist style and period in Alberta.

== History ==
=== Bill Wilson and Suburban Theatres ===
The theatre in 1940, shortly after construction

Sorority Tea in the Garneau lobby circa 1950. The furniture was designed for the royal visit in 1939.

Two girls sitting in a "two's company" seat. Original striped walls are visible in the background.

Walter Wilson was a Famous Players theatre manager in Winnipeg before moving his family to Edmonton to manage the Capitol Theatre in 1928. His son, Bill Wilson, worked for his father as an usher in Winnipeg before working as an engineer for the federal government.

When he married his wife, Bill promised her that he would never again work in the movie industry, but after being laid off in 1938, he began raising funds for a new chain of movie theatres. His company, Suburban Theatres, opened its first theatre, the Roxy, in 1938. His second theatre, The Garneau, opened on Thursday, October 24, 1940.

At the time, the theatre was described as "Spacious, attractively designed and modern in every detail". The ticket booth was encased in a bubble of vitrolite, the lobby was tiled in red, and the foyer featured the furniture specially commissioned for the George VI's stay at the Hotel Macdonald in 1939. Ushers in custom tailored red eaton jackets, deep blue trousers, and pill-box hats operated a free coat check and showed guests to their seats

The projection booth was equipped with dual Holmes 35mm arc lamp projectors which produced an extremely bright picture for the day.

The theatre featured 780 seats, including several red leather "two's company" seats without armrests. The space was also designed for live theatre, and featured a large stage with dressing rooms in the wings. Rather than an expensive balcony, architect William Blakey economized by incorporating a terrace which at the time was described as a "climbing mezzanine".

=== Famous Players ===
The Garneau was leased to Famous Players in 1941, guaranteeing the theatre a supply of first-run pictures. Wilson managed the theatre almost continuously save two years when he managed the Capitol, and two at the Paramount. Famous Players renovated the theatre in 1960, and installed larger seats, which lowered the seating capacity to 630.

Wilson retired as manager in 1971 but retained ownership of the theatre through the Suburban Theatre Group, which he continued to operate from an office in the Garneau's basement. At that time, he claimed to have seen only two movies in the previous eight years. Wilson died in January 1985.

Famous Players continued to operate the theatre until late 1990, when they announced they would not be renewing the lease. The theatre under Famous Players had gained a reputation for showing stodgy, uninteresting films and was being superseded by larger multiplexes.

=== Magic Lantern Theatres ===
Magic Lantern Theatres leased and reopened the Garneau as a discount theatre catering to university students in December 1991. The theatre came under pressure in 1992 when Toronto property developer Greg Sandwell applied to have the site rezoned for food and liquor service. Under this plan, the theatre would have become the Garneau Bar and Playhouse featuring dancing, indoor basketball, volleyball, and billiards. In response, Magic Lantern president Tom Hutchinson sought and found investors to purchase the theatre and preserve it as a repertory theatre. The Garneau remained open and continued to operate as a discount theatre until 1996 when it was renovated and switched to first-run films. Larger seats were installed, again lowering the theatre's seating capacity, this time to 527.

The theatre's existence was again threatened in 2001 when the University of Alberta threatened to expropriate the land under it. The plan eventually failed when faced with community opposition and prohibitive costs.

Local developer John Day purchased the Garneau from the investor group in 2007, promising "The theatre is not going anywhere". Plans were tabled in 2009 that would have dramatically altered the structure by adding a second floor of businesses These plans were abandoned after community opposition. The City of Edmonton agreed to pay $547,000 in return for an agreement to restore the building to its 1940 exterior appearance. The city designated the theatre a Municipal Historic Resource in 2009.

Magic Lantern Theatres ceased operating the Garneau in June 2011 citing a rent increase.

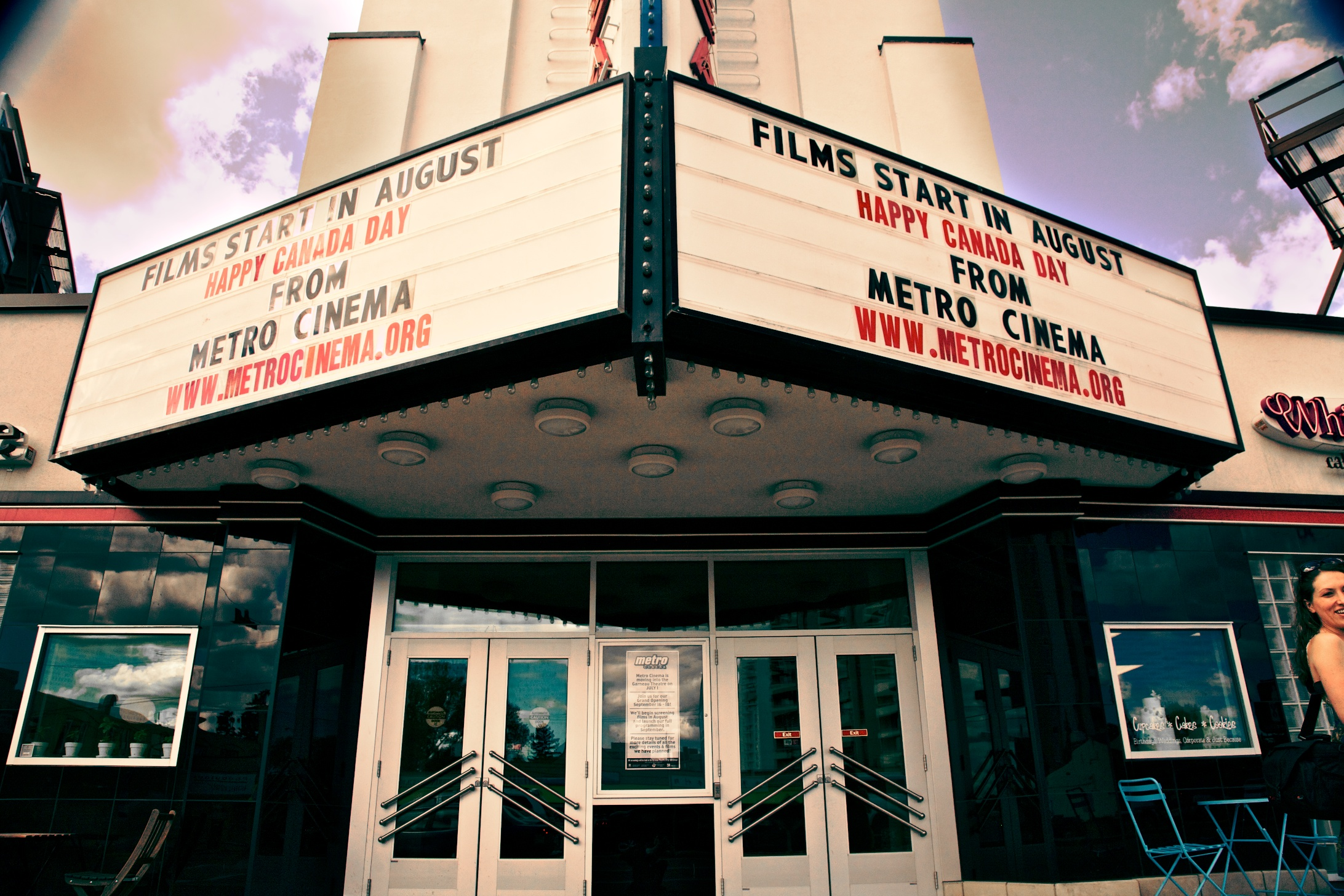
The Garneau in 2011

=== Metro Cinema Society ===
Edmonton's non-profit Metro Cinema Society took control of the Garneau Theatre on July 1, 2011. Representatives of Magic Lantern Theatres complained that the grant supported organization had pushed their private business out of the theatre. The theatre remained closed for more than two months while it underwent significant maintenance. One article noted that the carpets were cleaned "for the first time in speculation".

Metro officially reopened the Garneau on September 16, 2011 promising new films daily and guest curated festivals. Events staged at the Garneau annually include the Northwestfest documentary film festival, and the Rainbow Visions Film Festival for LGBTQ film.

== Architecture ==
Suburban Theatres commissioned William George Blakey as The Garneau Theatre's architect in the late 1930s. His other extant buildings include Edmonton's Christ Church, Masonic Temple, and Roxy Theatre. It is the last modernist theatre still used for its original purpose in Alberta.

Blakey's design economized by featuring a raised terrace rather than a balcony. The lobby was modern, featuring curved walls, understated gumwood doors, and simple semi-circular light fixtures. The theatre itself had a bold colour scheme, with recessed neon lighting, ultramarine walls, blue chairs, red love seats, and gold highlights around the proscenium.

Over the years, light fixtures from several other theatres were acquired and integrated into the Garneau. Currently, the theatre contains lighting salvaged from Edmonton's original Varscona Theatre (distinct from the current Varscona Theatre, a live venue), Innisfail's Royal Theatre, Melfort Saskatchewan's Grand Theatre, and Coeur d'Alene Idaho's Wilma Theatre.
