= Music of Alberta =

Alberta has a diverse music scene of pop, rock, country, jazz, folk, caribbean, classical, and blues music. Music festivals in the Summers are representing these genres. Choral music, ethnic music of many nationalities, all are found in Alberta.

The independent music scene was covered by independent magazines: Fast Forward Weekly in Calgary, and Vue Weekly in Edmonton, neither magazine is currently active. BeatRoute Magazine is still in publication, but covers a wider scope (western Canada, including British Columbia, Alberta, Saskatchewan, and Manitoba).

== History ==
Aboriginal music has been present in Alberta since the end of the last ice age, nearly 10,000 years ago in Southern Alberta, around 8,000 year ago in the North. Aboriginal instruments in this part of North America were limited to the voice and the easily made and portable drum. During the fur trade, European fur traders (mostly Orcadian Scots and French-Canadians) added a variety of their own instruments, such as the guitar and the accordion, but most importantly the fiddle. The fiddle became the basis of a distinctive style used in the Western fur trade and associated with the Métis people in particular. In his memoir Buffalo Days and Nights, respected Métis guide and interpreter Peter Erasmus writes that French Métis fiddlers from Lac Ste. Anne played for the Christmas celebrations at Fort Edmonton in 1856. This tradition persisted even after Ontarian and European immigration began to increase after 1870. A list of dances published in the Edmonton Bulletin on 3 February 1896 includes several of Métis and Scottish origin.

== Alberta music organizations ==
- ACMA The Association of Country Music in Alberta
- AMIA Alberta Music Industry Association
- CMC Canada Music Centre (Calgary)
- Edmonton Symphony Orchestra
- Edmonton Opera Association
- Calgary Civic Symphony
- Calgary Philharmonic Orchestra
- Calgary Opera
- Cosmopolitan Music Society
- NMC National Music Centre (Calgary)
- Rocky Mountain Symphony Orchestra

== Music festivals ==
- Brooks Music Festival
- Canmore Folk Music Festival
- Edmonton Folk Music Festival
- Calgary Folk Music Festival
- Calgary International Blues Festival
- Calgary Midwinter Bluesfest
- North Country Fair
- South Country Fair
- PeaceFest
- Edmonton's Labatt Blues Festival
- Edmonton International Jazz Festival
- Blueberry Bluegrass Festival
- Big Valley Jamboree
- Purple City Music Festival in Edmonton
- Calgary International Reggae Festival
- Sonic Boom
- Soundtrack Music Festival

== Prominent figures ==
The following are some musical figures associated with the Canadian province of Alberta.

- Axis of Advance
- Violet Archer
- Jann Arden
- Ruth B.
- Tommy Banks
- Moe Berg
- Big Sugar
- Bill Bourne
- Paul Brandt
- Cadence Weapon
- Captain Tractor
- Carson Cole
- Emerson Drive
- Faunts
- Feist
- George Fox
- Jerry Jerry and the Sons of Rhythm Orchestra
- Jr. Gone Wild
- Carolyn Dawn Johnson
- Katie B
- k.d. lang
- Billy Klippert
- Loverboy
- Corb Lund
- Cripple Creek Fairies
- Tate McRae
- Joni Mitchell
- Nickelback from Hanna. Had a #1 Billboard Hot 100 hit with the post-grunge/hard rock "How You Remind Me" in 2001–2002. This was the Billboard Year-End #1 single of 2002. They had a #1 album on the Billboard 200 with All the Right Reasons in 2005.
- Melissa O'Neil
- Maren Ord
- Out of Your Mouth
- Kalan Porter
- Jan Randall
- Ruth B
- Shout Out Out Out Out
- SNFU
- Social Code
- Stereos
- Tariq
- Tegan and Sara
- Mark Templeton
- Ten Second Epic
- The Dudes
- The Grassroot Deviation
- The Provincial Archive
- The Smalls
- The Stampeders
- Theo Tams
- Tupelo Honey
- Ian Tyson
- Chad VanGaalen
- The Wet Secrets
- Zuckerbaby
- Kobra and the Lotus
- Morgan Lander, lead vocalist and guitarist of Kittie
- Viathyn
- Purity Ring
- Ukrainian Male Chorus of Edmonton
