= List of festivals in Alberta =

Festivals of Alberta
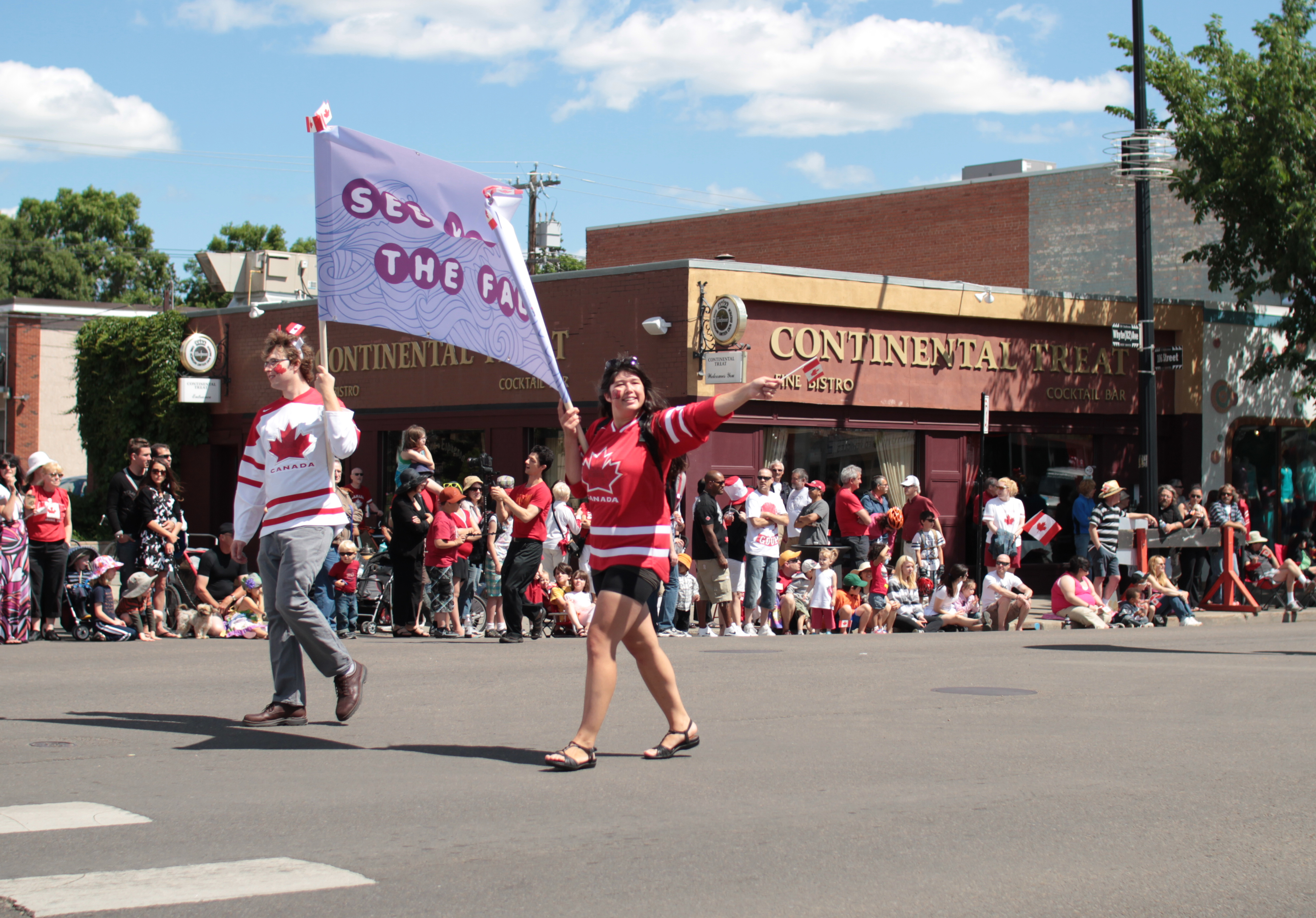

External sublists
- By city: Festivals of Calgary; festivals of Edmonton; festivals of Lethbridge

Related topics
- Festivals of Canada; (British Columbia; Manitoba; Ontario; Quebec; Saskatchewan); culture of Alberta; tourism in Alberta

Several festivals are held in the Canadian province of Alberta each year. This list includes several types of festivals in the province, such as regional festivals, commerce festivals, fairs, food festivals, arts festivals, religious festivals, folk festivals, music festivals, and recurring festivals on holidays.

== Sublists ==
=== By city ===
- List of festivals in Calgary
- List of festivals in Edmonton
- List of festivals in Lethbridge

=== By type ===
- List of music festivals in Canada#Alberta

== Festivals ==
=== Calgary Region ===
Festivals in Calgary Region
Festival	Place	Time	Remarks
Tabestoon Festival	Olympic Plaza	12-13 August	Iranian music, art and food
Airdrie Festival Of Lights	Airdrie	December	Rides, Christmas lights, refreshments
Afrikadey!	Calgary	Early August	Africa themed festival
Calgary Arab Film Festival	Calgary	October	Film festival
Calgary Jazz Festival	Calgary	Late June	Jazz music
Calgary C-Jazz CARNIVALE	Calgary	Late August	Jazz music
Calgary Folk Music Festival	Calgary	Late July	Folk music festival
Calgary Exhibition and Stampede	Calgary	Mid-July	Rodeo, exhibition
Calgary Fringe Festival	Calgary	August	Fringe festival
Calgary International Children's Festival	Calgary	Late May	
Calgary International Film Festival	Calgary	September/October	Film festival
Calgary International Spoken Word Festival	Calgary	Late March / April	Spoken word festival
Calgary Underground Film Festival	Calgary	September/October	Film festival
Calgary Winterfest	Calgary	February	
Canmore Highland Games	Canmore	Annually on Labour Day weekend	Celtic sports, music and dance
Canmore Folk Festival	Canmore	Annually on Heritage Day weekend	folk music festival
Carifest	Calgary	June	Caribbean festival on Stephen Avenue and Prince's Island Park
ENMAX Zoolights	Calgary	December/January	Held at the Calgary Zoo
Chasing Summer Music Festival	Calgary	Late July/early August	Electronic music festival held annually at Max Bell Arena
Cochrane Winterfest	Cochrane	January 25 & 26	Held at the Cochrane Lions Rodeo Park
Expo Latino	Calgary	Late August	Latino festival in Prince's Island Park
"Fiestaval" Latin Festival	Calgary	July 19, 20, 2008	Latin music, outdoors, beer gardens
GlobalFest	Calgary	August 21–29, 2009	Multi-ethnic festival and fireworks
High Performance Rodeo	Calgary	January	Theatre, music, dance, visual arts
International Festival of Animated Objects	Calgary	January	Puppeteering festival
Calgary International Blues Festival	Calgary	August	blues music festival
Labour Day Rodeo and Parade	Cochrane	Labour Day weekend	Rodeo
Lilac Festival	Calgary	Late May	Street festival
North American Championship Chuckwagon Races and Guy Weadick Pro Rodeo	High River		
Reggae Festival	Calgary	Mid-August	Reggae music
Shady Grove Bluegrass Festival	Nanton	Third weekend of August	Music Festival
Shakespeare in the Park	Calgary	July	Theater
Sled Island	Calgary	July	Music festival
Spruce Meadows International show-jumping tournament	Calgary		
Sun and Salsa Festival	Calgary	Mid-July	
Taste of Calgary	Calgary		
Wordfest	Calgary		
X-Fest	Calgary	August	Alternative music festival in Fort Calgary, Labour Day weekend
FozzyFest	Calgary (South Kananaskis)	Canada Day long weekend	Electronic music
Inshala	Calgary (South Fort Macleod)	Mid-June	Electronic music and conference
Treemendus	Calgary (Mountain View County)	Labour Day weekend	Electronic music
Windwood Music Festival	Airdrie	September	Classical and contemporary music

=== Edmonton Region ===
Festivals in the Edmonton Capital Region
Festival	Place	Time	Remarks
Ice on Whyte	Edmonton	Late January	Ice sculpture
Winter Light	Edmonton	January - March	Celebration of winter spirit
International Mother Language Day	Edmonton	February	BPCA's celebration 69
Silver Skate Festival and Edmonton Winter Triathlon	Edmonton	Early February	Winter festival
Edmonton's International Beerfest	Edmonton	Early Spring	Beer festival
Edmonton Poetry Festival	Edmonton	April	Poetry
Bengali New Year Festival	Edmonton	April	BHESA's Boishakhi Mela
Opera NUOVA's Vocal Arts Festival	Edmonton	May/June	Opera / art song
International Children's Festival	St. Albert	May/June	
Improvaganza	Edmonton	June	Improv
Dreamspeakers International Film Festival	Edmonton	June	Aboriginal filmmakers, performers and artists
Free Will Shakespeare Festival	Edmonton	June/July	Shakespeare plays
The Works Art & Design Festival	Edmonton	June/July	Design and art exhibitions
Dragonfly Music Festival	Wabamun	June–July	Canada Day weekend; Canadian music
Beaumont Music Festival	Beaumont	Mid-June	All Canadian music festival
K-Days (formerly Klondike Days)	Edmonton	Late July	Exhibition and fair
Edmonton Heritage Festival	Edmonton	Early August	Traditional dance, foods, and crafts
Edmonton Latin Festival	Edmonton	Mid-August	Latin culture and music
Edmonton Music & Speech Arts Festival	Edmonton	Mid-April–early-May	Classical Music, Musical Theatre, Speech Arts
Cariwest Caribbean Arts Festival	Edmonton	Mid-August	Caribbean carnival
Edmonton Dragon Boat Festival	Edmonton	Mid-August	Dragon boat
Edmonton Folk Music Festival	Edmonton	Mid-August	Folk music festival
Edmonton International Film Festival	Edmonton	Late September/Early October	Independent film
Edmonton International Literary Festival	Edmonton	Late October	Nonfiction writing
Edmonton International Fringe Theatre Festival	Edmonton	August	Fringe festival
Edmonton International Jazz Festival	Edmonton	July	Jazz
Edmonton International Street Performer's Festival	Edmonton	Early July	Busking
Edmonton Short Film Festival	Edmonton	First Weekend of October	Alberta indie short film
A Taste of Edmonton	Edmonton	Late July	Food and restaurants
Rock'n August	St. Albert	Mid-August	Car show, live music
Expo Latino	Edmonton	Late August	Latino culture
Symphony Under the Sky	Edmonton	Early September	Symphony
SONiC BOOM	Edmonton	September	Alternative and indie rock
What the Truck?!	Edmonton	Mid-September	Food truck festival
Roar Spoken Word Festival	Edmonton	Mid-September	Poetry/spoken word festival
Pure Speculation	Edmonton	November	Geek and fan culture festival
Purple City Music Festival	Edmonton	August	Music festival
Canadian Finals Rodeo	Edmonton	Mid-November	Rodeo
Festival of Trees	Edmonton	December	Christmas trees
Bright Lights Festival	Edmonton	Late December/Early January	Large Christmas lights display
New Year's Eve Downtown	Edmonton	New Year's Eve	

=== Rockies ===
Festivals in the Alberta Rockies
Festival	Place	Time	Remarks
Ampfest Canmore	Canmore	Early July	Metal & Punk festival
Banff Culture Walk	Banff		
Banff Mountain Film Festival	Banff	Late October	Mountain film festival
Banff Mountain Book Festival	Banff	Late October	
Banff Summer Arts Festival	Banff		
Banff World Television Festival	Banff	Mid-June	Television programming event
Canmore artsPeak Arts Festival	Canmore		
Canmore Folk Music Festival	Canmore		
Canmore Highland Games	Canmore		
Dance Summit Invitational	Hinton	April	Dance festival in the foothills of Jasper National Park www.dancesummit.org
Ice Magic Weekend - International Ice Sculpting Competition	Lake Louise		
Jasper Heritage Rodeo	Jasper		
Jasper in January	Jasper	January	Three themed weekends running from the middle to the end of January, packed with events, deals and activities from a street party to dogsledding to food tasting.
Jasper Dark Sky Festival	Jasper	October	Stargazing
Mary Reimer Memorial Rodeo	Hinton		
Mozart on the Mountain	Canmore		Symphonic concert
Wild Mountain Music Fest	Hinton	July 15, 16, 17 - 2016	Rock and roll, country, blues, rockabilly, Latin, funk, and salsa music
WinterStart Weekend in Banff	Banff		

=== Central Alberta ===
Festivals in Central Alberta
Festival	Place	Time	Remarks
"Bring in Spring" Beef Supper, Silent Auction	Anthony Henday Museum, Delburne, Alberta	April	Fundraising
Athabasca Fringe Festival	Athabasca	July	Fringe festival
Band Ranch	Evansburg, Alberta	July 31-August 3	
Boom Town Music Festival	Ol'Macdonalds Resort, Buffalo Lake, Erskine, Alberta	September 5–6	Alternative country, bluegrass, folk
Blueberry Bluegrass Country Music Festival	Stony Plain	August	Country music
Big Valley Jamboree	Camrose	August	Country music
Bro-Tel Backyard Festival	Myrnam	August	Alternative/Rock/Country music
Centre Fest: International Street Performers Festival	Red Deer	August	Street theatre
David Thompson Days Country Fair	Rocky Mountain House	August	Fair
Kikino Celebration Days & Silver Birch Rodeo	Kikino	3rd weekend in August	Parade, rodeo, bingo, steak supper, trade show, fireworks
East Coulee SpringFest	Drumheller	May 11–13, 2012	38 bands, 4 venues, 100 musicians, all rock out in the badlands for one weekend
Lac La Biche Pow Wow and Fish Derby	Lac La Biche		
Maple Flag	Cold Lake	May–June	Aerial combat exercise
Medicine Lodge Rodeo	Edson	May	Rodeo
Nordlys Film & Arts Festival	Camrose	February	Film festival, live music
Ponoka Stampede	Ponoka	June/July	Rodeo
Rocky Air Show	Rocky Mountain House	August	Air show
Sidewalk Jamboree	Edson	August	Fair
Shake The Lake	SylvanLake	August	Action sports and music festival
Spin Out Festival	Camp Maskepetoon	June	Circus and fire spinning festival
Texas Connection	Innisfail	Mid-August	Music festival
Thunder in the Valley Drag Races	Drayton Valley	Late August	
Vermilion Fair	Vermilion	Last weekend of July	Fair
Come By The Hills Music Festival	Mistahiya Retreat Centre between Vermilion and Wainwright	3rd weekend of August	Folk, country, rock Music festival
Wainwright Stampede	Wainwright	Third week (or last full week) of June, Thur-Sun	Chuckwagons, indoor concert/cabaret, midway, parade, and rodeo
Westerner Days Fair and Exhibition	Red Deer	July	Fair
Zion Noiz Music & Arts Festival	Alberta	June	Music & Arts

=== Northern Alberta ===
Festivals in Northern Alberta
Festival	Place	Time	Remarks
Eaglesham July 1st. Celebration	Eaglesham Park, Eaglesham Alberta	July 1	Family event in the Peace River Region
Reel Shorts Film Festival	Grande Prairie	May	International festival of short films
North Country Fair	Slave Lake	June	
Astral Harvest Music Festival	Slave Lake	July	Electronic and live music
Falher Honey Festival	Falher	June	Beekeeping festival
Alberta Open Sand Sculpture Championship	Lesser Slave Lake Provincial Park	July	Sand castle and sculptures on the beaches of Lesser Slave Lake
Gold Cup Jet Boat Race	Peace River	July	
Magnificent River Rats Festival	Athabasca	July	Parade, music, marketplace, children's activities
North Country Fair	Driftpile	June	Music, marketplace, camping, children's activities
Peace Fest	Peace River	July	Live music, marketplace
Summerslam	Grande Prairie, Fort McMurray	July	
Telus Country Fever Music Festival	Grande Prairie	July	
InterPLAY Festival	Fort McMurray	August	
Peace Country Gospel Jamboree	Beaverlodge	August	
The Bear Creek Folk Festival	Grande Prairie	August	
Blueberry Festival	Fort McMurray	Early September	Parade, midway, fireworks
Canadian Championship of Custom Bike Building	Beaverlodge, Wembley	Early September	Motorcycle trade show
Golden Walleye Classic	High Prairie	September	

=== Southern Alberta ===
Festivals in Southern Alberta
Festival	Place	Time	Remarks
Lethbridge International Film Festival	Lethbridge	April	Film festival
Lethbridge Music Fest	Lethbridge	April 23	Music festival
#mywatertoneats Food Festival	Waterton Lakes National Park	End of May-Beginning of June	celebrating the culinary talent in Waterton
Stirling Community Garage sale	Stirling	Victoria Day	Community garage sale
Beethoven in the Badlands	Drumheller	Late May	Symphonic concert
Spectrum Festival	Medicine Hat	Each year the first weekend of June	Family festival
Beiseker Country Fair	Beiseker	Each year, second weekend of June	Family festival
The Gathering – Cowboy Poetry	Pincher Creek	Mid-June	Cowboy poetry, music, crafts and art
Waterton Wildflower Festival	Waterton Lakes National Park	Mid-Late June	Workshops and guided flower hikes
Medicine Hat Jazz Fest	Medicine Hat	Late June	Jazz festival
Raymond Stampede	Raymond	Early July	Rodeo
The Canadian Badlands Passion Play	Drumheller	Early to mid-July	Outdoor theater
Rosebud Summer Concert Series	Rosebud	Weekends in July and August	Outdoor live music festival on the Rosebud Festival Stage
Loud As Hell Festival	Drumheller	July 31 - Aug 2	Drumheller Stampede Barn
Stirling Settler Days	Stirling	Mid-July	Pancake breakfast, firefighter games, parade, community dance, a rodeo, and fireworks
Bluegrass Country Music Festival	Hill Spring	Late July	Country music
Medicine Hat Exhibition & Stampede	Medicine Hat	Late July	Rodeo, exhibition
Rum Runners Days	Crowsnest Pass	Late July	Heritage festival
South Country Fair	Fort Macleod	Late July	Camping, music and arts festival
Whoop-Up Days Summer Fair & Rodeo	Lethbridge	August	Rodeo and fair
Lethbridge Electronic Music Festival	Lethbridge	August	Local and regional electronic music acts
Southern Alberta Music Festival	Aspen Crossing, Mossleigh, Alberta	August 24	Live music, 11 am to midnight, 8 to 10 artists
Waterton Wildlife Festival	Waterton Lakes National Park	Mid-Late September	Workshops and info about animals living in the Park
FrankenFest	Warner, Alberta	Labour Day Weekend	Live music, haunted house
Stirling Fall Festival	Stirling	September 13	Wagon rides, horseshoe tournament, supper, cup stacking, and a movie in the park
Love & Records	Lethbridge, Alberta	September 17	Live music, record fair (vinyl), BBQ, raffles, parkour, art gallery, family zone, beer gardens
The Word on the Street	Lethbridge	September 21	Outdoor festival celebrating literacy and the written word
Pincher Creek Parade of Lights	Pincher Creek	November	
Cowboy Christmas Show	Hill Spring	November and December	Barn dance
Victorian Prairie Christmas	Stirling	December	Old-fashioned Christmas held at the Galt Historic Railway Park

== See also ==
- List of festivals in Canada
- Culture of Alberta
- Tourism in Alberta
