= List of festivals in Calgary =

Festivals of Calgary
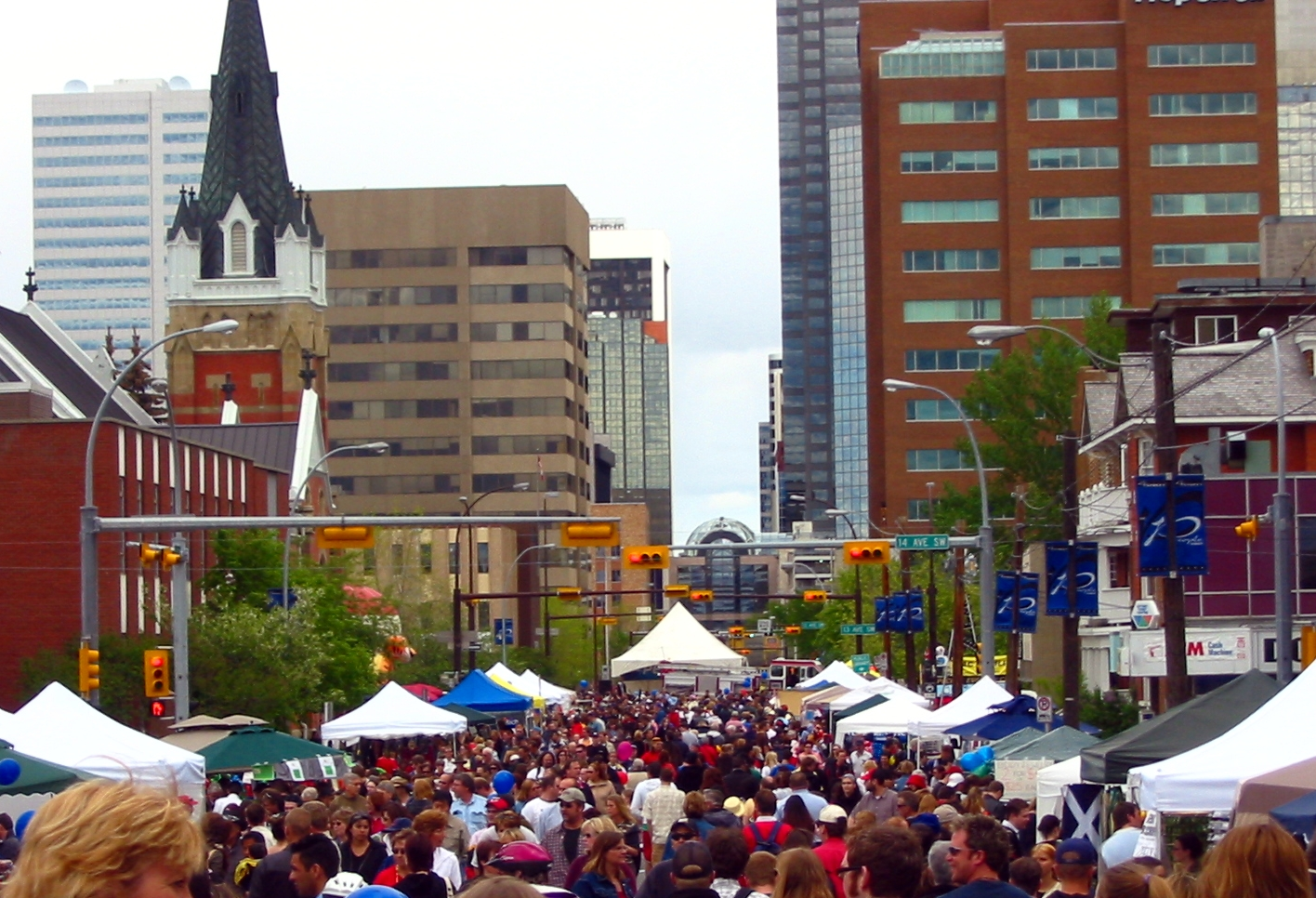

Related topics
- Festivals of Canada; festivals of Alberta; lists of festivals by city (Calgary; Edmonton; Lethbridge; Montreal; Ottawa; Toronto; Vancouver; Winnipeg); tourism in Calgary

The following is an incomplete list of annual festivals and cultural events in Calgary and the Calgary Region, in the province of Alberta, Canada.

This list includes festivals of diverse types, such as regional festivals, commerce festivals, fairs, food festivals, arts festivals, religious festivals, folk festivals, and recurring festivals on holidays.

== List of festivals in Calgary ==
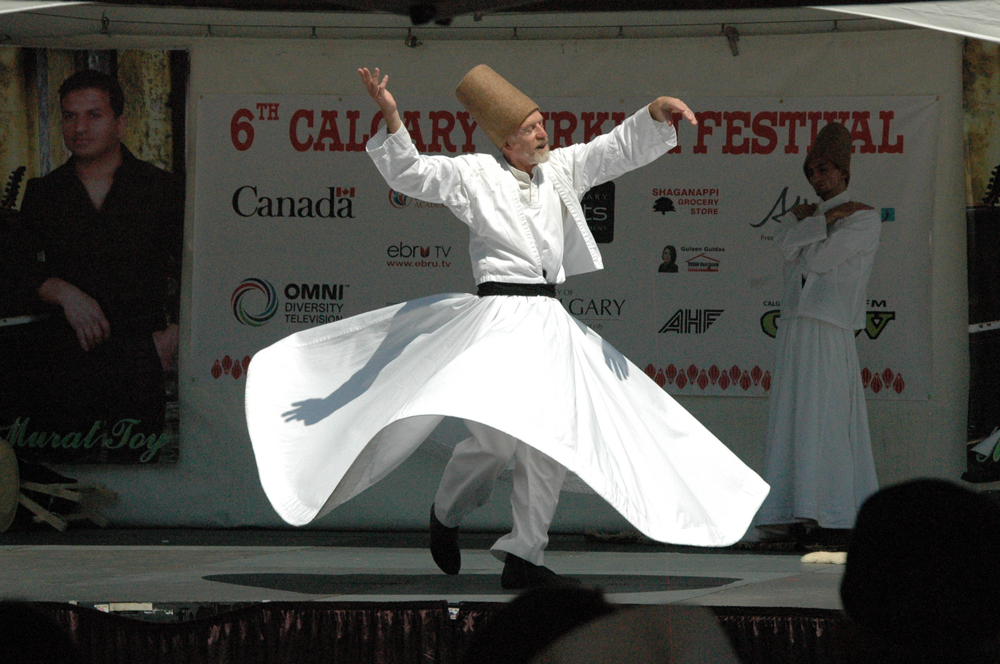
Whirling dervishes at Calgary Turkish Festival

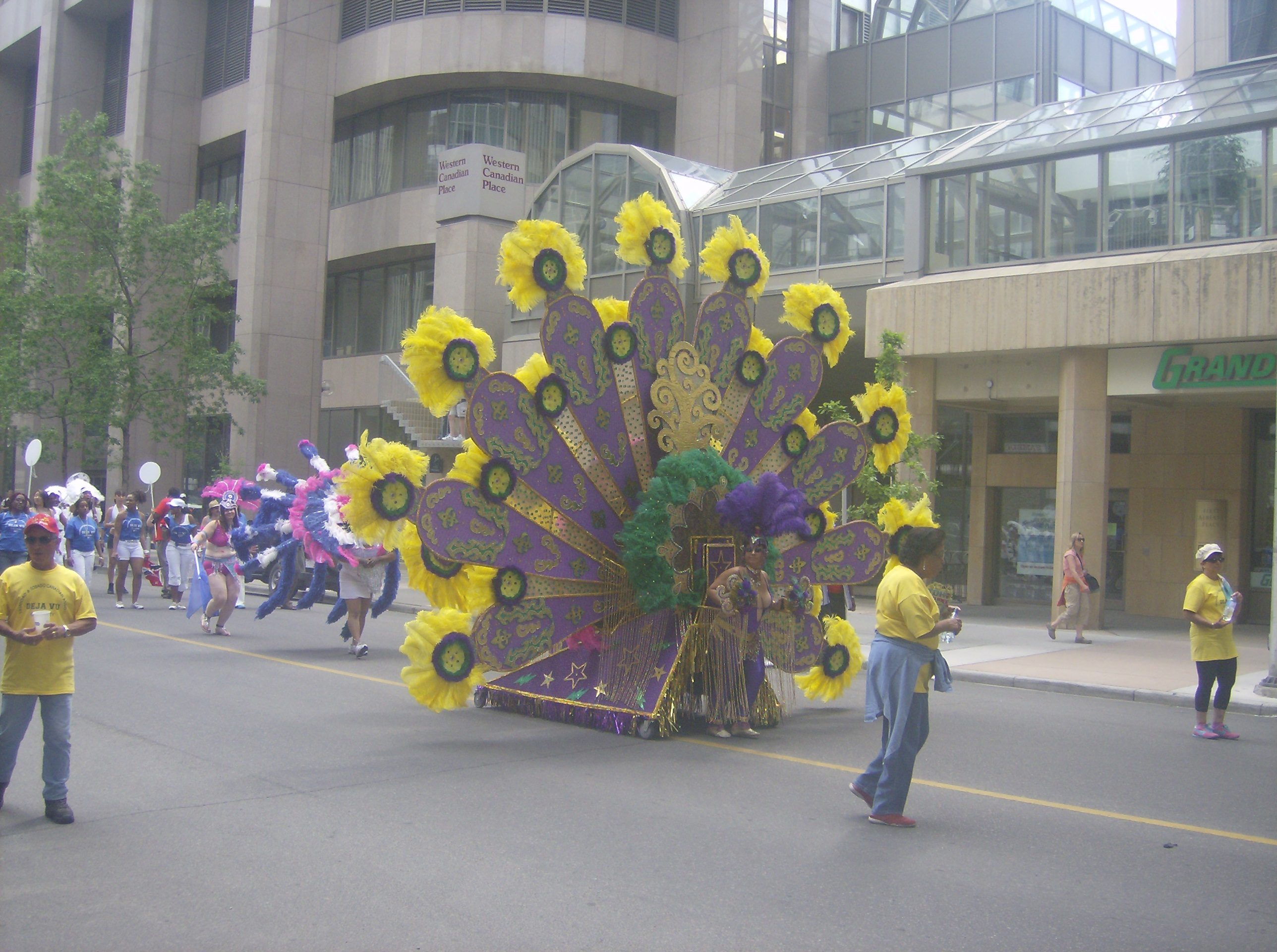
Carifest 2007 opening day parade

Festival	Occurrence	Location	Description
Country Thunder Alberta	Last weekend of June	Calgary: The Confluence	country music festival
Calgary Stampede	July 5-14, 2024	Calgary	“The Greatest Outdoor Show on Earth.”
Cowboys Music Festival	July 4-15, 2024	Calgary: Stampede Park	
Badlands Music Festival	July 6-14, 2024	Calgary	
Fiestaval Latino Festival	July 19-21, 2024	Calgary: Olympic Plaza	
Calgary Folk Music Festival (aka Calgary Folk Fest)	July 25-28, 2024	Calgary: Prince’s Island Park	folk music festival
Calgary International Blues Festival	July 28- Aug 3, 2025	Calgary: The Confluence	blues music festival
CSIO Spruce Meadows 'Masters' Tournament	July	Calgary: Spruce Meadows	equestrian show jumping tournament
Festival of Chariots (Rath Yatra)	July	Calgary	religious Hindu festival
High River International Food Festival	July	High River	food festival
Inglewood Sunfest	July	Calgary: Inglewood	street fair
Inspirefest	July	Calgary	festival for Alberta-based music, artists, artisans, horticulture, and vendors
Roundup MusicFest	July	Calgary: Prince’s Island Park	music festival co-produced by 51 North Productions and Live Nation Entertainment
Oxford STOMP	July	Calgary: Prince’s Island Park	alternative rock music festival
ShadyGrove Bluegrass Festival	July	Sundre	bluegrass music festival
Shakespeare by the Bow (or Shakespeare On The Go)	July - August	Calgary	Shakespeare festival presented by Theatre Calgary
Chasing Summer Music Festival	Aug 3 & 4, 2024	Calgary: Max Bell Centre	music festival presented by Live Nation Entertainment
Afrikadey! Film Festival	August	Calgary	
Afrikadey! Music Festival	August	Calgary	
Caesar Week	August	Calgary	week-long festival celebrating caesar cocktails
Calgary Dragon Boat Race & Festival	August	Calgary	
Calgary Fringe Festival	August	Calgary	fringe theatre festival
Calgary Japanese Festival “Omatsuri”	August	Calgary	
Calgary Pride	August	Calgary	LGBTQ+ Pride parade and festival
Carifest	August	Calgary	Caribbean cultural festival
Chinatown Street Festival	August	Calgary	Chinese cultural festival in Chinatown
Expo Latino	August	Calgary	Latino cultural festival
GlobalFest	August	Calgary	consists of OneWorld Festival and International Fireworks Festival
Great Outdoors Comedy Festival	August	Calgary: Prince's Island Park	Outdoor comedy festival presented by Trixstar LIVE
GuitarFestWest	August	Calgary: Mount Royal University	week-long classical guitar festival
Canmore Folk Festival	August (Heritage Day weekend)	Canmore	folk music festival
Heritage Day Festival	August (first Monday)	Calgary	
International Reggae Festival	August	Calgary	
Marda Gras	August	Calgary: Marda Loop	street festival
Mountain View International Festival of Song and Chamber Music	August	Calgary	
When Words Collide	August	Calgary	festival for commercial and literary fiction
Tabestoon Festival	August (biennially)	Calgary	Iranian arts and culture festival, organized by the Persian Gulf Foundation
Taste of Calgary	August (third weekend)	Calgary	food and drink festival
Artember	September	Airdrie	art festival
Beakerhead	September	Calgary	celebration of art, science and engineering
Barbecue on the Bow	September	Calgary	culinary festival and barbecue competition
BrazilFest	September	Calgary	
Calgary Corporate Challenge September Games	September	Calgary	2-week corporate team-building event that features various competitions "focusing on teamwork and networking"
Calgary Highland Games	September (Labour Day weekend)	Calgary	Celtic sports, music and dance
Canmore Highland Games	September (Labour Day weekend)	Canmore	Celtic sports, music and dance
Cochrane Lions Labour Day Rodeo	September (Labour Day weekend)	Cochrane	rodeo
Heritage Park Railway Days	September	Heritage Park	
Calgary Arab Film Festival	October	Calgary	
Calgary International Film Festival	September / October	Calgary	
Calgary Tattoo & Arts Festival	October	Calgary	
Canadian Breast Cancer Foundation "CIBC Run for the Cure"	October	Calgary	
Rocky Mountain Wine and Food Festival	October	Calgary	
Wordfest: Calgary International Writers' Festival	October	Calgary	
Calgary Justice Film Festival (formerly Marda Loop Justice Film Festival)	November	Calgary	environmental and social justice film festival
CUFF.Docs Documentary Film Festival	November	Calgary	Non-fiction film festival presented by the Calgary Underground Film Festival
Otafest Aurora	November	Calgary	anime convention, smaller version of Otafest in the spring/summer
Airdrie Festival Of Lights	December	Airdrie	Rides, Christmas lights, refreshments
Emerging Artism	December	Calgary	
Once Upon A Christmas	December	Calgary	
Zoolights	December / January	Wilder Institute/Calgary Zoo	6-week Christmas/holiday festival
High Performance Rodeo	January	Calgary	3-week international festival of live art produced by One Yellow Rabbit
International Festival of Animated Objects	January	Calgary	
Chinook Blast	February 2-19, 2024	Calgary	Tourism Calgary's winter festival
Picture this…film festival	February	Calgary	postponed since 2020 due to the COVID-19 pandemic, as of 2022
Artifact Small Format Film Festival (formerly $100 Film Festival)	March	Calgary	celluloid-based film festival
Gluten Free Expo	March	Calgary	
MTT Fest	March	Calgary	
Rodeo Royal	March	Calgary	
Calgary Comic and Entertainment Expo	April	Calgary	
Calgary Beer Festival	April	Calgary	
Calgary International Spoken Word Festival	April	Calgary	
Calgary Maple Festival des Sucres	April	Calgary	
Calgary Underground Film Festival (CUFF)	April	Calgary	
Vaisakhi Mela	April	Calgary	Punjabi spring harvest festival
FunnyFest Calgary Comedy Festival	May + June	Calgary	
Calgary International Children's Festival	May	Calgary	
Fairy Tales Queer Film Festival	May	Calgary	
Heritage Park Festival of Quilts	May	Calgary: Heritage Park	
Lilac Festival	May	Calgary: Beltline + Mission	street festival
Otafest	May	Calgary	anime convention
Puppet Power: Festival of Ideas	May	Calgary	
Calgary Greek Festival	June	Calgary	
Commuter Challenge Week	June (week of June 5)	Calgary	
Ignite! Theatre-Arts Festival	June	Calgary	
Light & Motion Prop Arts and Circus Festival	June	Calgary	
MEC Bikefest	June	Calgary	
MEC Paddlefest	June	Calgary	
Sled Island Music and Arts Festival	June	Calgary	independent music and arts festival
Calgary Ukrainian Festival	June	Calgary, Acadia Recreation Complex	Ukrainian culture and heritage

== Most attended festivals ==
=== Calgary Stampede ===
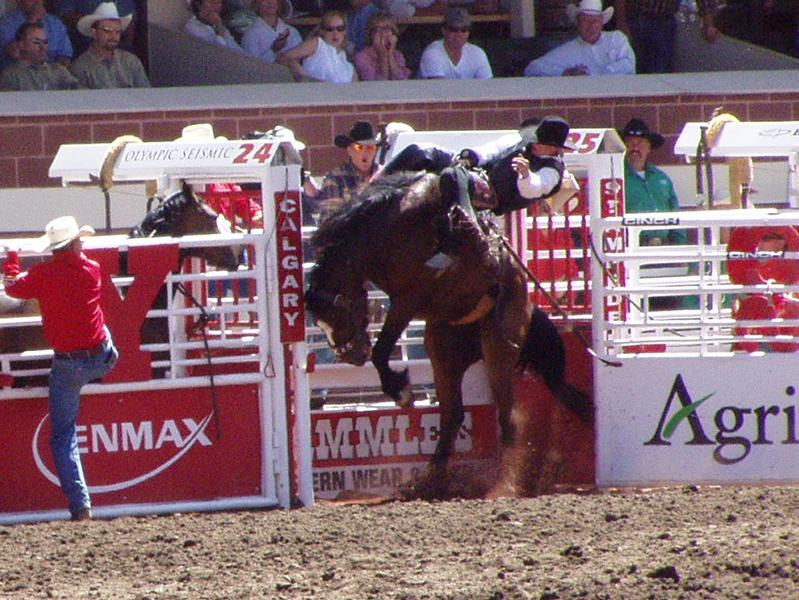
Rider at the Stampede Rodeo

The city of Calgary is famous for the Calgary Stampede, a large agricultural fair and rodeo held every July. The Stampede officially bills itself as "The Greatest Outdoor Show on Earth". It features an internationally recognized rodeo competition, a midway, stage shows, agricultural competitions, chuckwagon races, First Nations exhibitions, and pancake breakfasts around the city. It is among the largest and most well known festivals in Canada. The event has a 113 year history. In 2005, attendance at the 10-day rodeo and exhibition totaled 1,242,928, which set a new record. Attendance at the Stampede Parade (North America's second longest parade), which takes place downtown on opening day, is usually somewhere between 300,000 and 400,000. During Stampede Week, many of the city's residents dress in country attire, and many businesses decorate their stores and offices in western style.

=== Lilac Festival ===
The Lilac Festival is an annual street festival held in Calgary, Alberta. In 2005 it had an estimated 120,000 attendance. The festival takes place along the 13 blocks of 4th Street (between 13th Avenue South and Elbow Drive) in the Beltline and Mission neighborhoods.

=== Sun and Salsa Festival ===
The Sun and Salsa Festival is an annual festival put on in the Kensington Business Revitalization Zone (BRZ) of Calgary. Attendance of the festival has grown to around 100,000 in 2010.

== Former festivals ==
This is a list of festivals that no longer exist, have been on a prolonged hiatus, or festivals that were once held in Calgary but have since moved to elsewhere.

- Bow River Flow (August) — human-powered transportation festival
- Calgary Corn Festival - Kingsland Farmers' Market (August)
- Calgary Intercultural Turkish Festival (July)
- FozzyFest (Canada Day long weekend) — outdoor electronic music festival in South Kananaskis
- Haultain and First Street Festival in Victoria Park (September)
- Morningside Music Bridge (July) — international music festival, originally hosted by Mount Royal University in Calgary but now held in Boston
- Summerstock (August)
- Sun and Salsa Festival (July) — Latin festival in Kensington. In 2015, organizers announced that the festival would be cancelled due to construction developments in the community, and has been under an indefinite hiatus since.
- X-Fest Calgary (August) — Alternative music festival in Fort Calgary.

== See also ==
- List of festivals in Alberta
- List of festivals in Canada
- Lists of festivals by city
- Culture of Calgary
- List of attractions and landmarks in Calgary
