= List of festivals in Winnipeg =

Festivals of Winnipeg

Related topics
- Festivals of Canada; festivals of Manitoba; lists of festivals by city (Calgary; Edmonton; Lethbridge; Montreal; Ottawa; Toronto); culture in Winnipeg; tourism in Winnipeg

This is a list of festivals in Winnipeg, Manitoba, Canada. This list includes festivals of diverse types, such as regional festivals, commerce festivals, fairs, food festivals, arts festivals, religious festivals, folk festivals, and recurring festivals on holidays. The city hosts several large festivals each year including Winnipeg Folk Festival, Winnipeg Jazz Festival, and Winnipeg Fringe Theatre Festival.

== Art and craft festivals ==
- Manitoba Fibre Festival
- Nuit Blanche Winnipeg
- Wall-to-Wall Mural & Culture Festival
- Winnipeg Design Festival

== Children's festivals ==
- Festival of Fools
- Freeze Frame International Film Festival for Kids of All Ages
- Teddy Bears' Picnic
- Winnipeg International Children's Festival (KidsFest)

== Comedy festivals ==
- Canadian International Comedy Film Festival
- Great Outdoors Comedy Festival
- Oddblock Comedy Festival (former)
- Winnipeg Comedy Festival
- Winnipeg Improv Festival

== Cultural festivals ==
- Africa Day Festival (AfriFest)
- Asian Canadian Festival
- Culture Days
- Festival Colombiano
- Festival du Voyageur
- Folklorama
- Kultivation Festival
- Manitoba Filipino Street Festival
- Manitoba Ukrainian Dance Festival
- Polish Fest
- Tarbut: Festival of Jewish Culture
- Winnipeg Chinatown Street Festival
- Winnipeg Irish Festival
- Winnipeg Scottish Festival

== Film festivals ==
- Architecture+Design Film Festival
- Cinémental
- FascinAsian Film Festival
- Gimme Some Truth Documentary Festival
- L'Alliance Française French Film Festival
- Winnipeg International Jewish Film Festival
- Winnipeg Reel to Reel Film Festival
- WNDX Festival of Moving Image

== Food & beverage festivals ==
- Flatlander's Beer Festival
- Rotary RibFest
- Winnipeg Whiskey Festival
- Winnipeg Wine Festival

== Indigenous festivals and public celebrations ==
- Aboriginal Day Live & Festival
- APTN Indigenous Day Live
- Keeping the Fires Burning
- Manito Ahbee Festival
- National Indigenous Peoples Day celebrations at The Forks
- sākihiwē festival (formerly Aboriginal Music Week)
- Winnipeg Aboriginal Film Festival

== Literary festivals ==
- Winnipeg International Storytelling Festival
- Winnipeg International Writers Festival

== Music festivals ==
- Agassiz Chamber Music Festival
- Big Fun Festival
- ChoralFest
- Cluster: New Music + Integrated Arts Festival
- Community Band Festival
- Concert Band Festival
- Jazz Band Festival
- Manitoba Electronic Music Exhibition
- Manitoba Metalfest
- Northern Touch Music Festival and Conference
- Soca Reggae Festival
- Solo and Ensemble Festival
- Summer of Sound
- Winnipeg Folk Festival (held at Birds Hill Provincial Park)
- Winnipeg International Jazz Festival
- Winnipeg Music Festival
- Winnipeg New Music Festival

== Other festivals ==
- Canad Inns Winter Wonderland
- CURRENT Winnipeg
- Doors Open Winnipeg
- Dragon Boat Festival
- Manitoba Liquor & Lotteries ManyFest
- MayWorks Festival of Labour and the Arts
- Red River Exhibition
- Rodarama
- Science Rendezvous Winnipeg
- Spur Winnipeg
- Summer Entertainment Series at Assiniboine Park
- Winnipeg Fish Festival
- Ellice Street Festival

== LGBTQ festivals ==
- Pride Winnipeg
- Qaleidoscope Queer Film Festival (touring festival)
- Reel Pride Film Festival

== Pop culture festivals ==
- Ai-Kon - Anime convention
- Central Canada Comic Con
- Manitoba Comic & Sci-Fi Expo
- Winnipeg Comic & Toy Expo

== Stage and theatre festivals ==
- FemFest
- Manitoba Drama Youth Festival
- Manitoba Provincial Dance Festival
- Royal MTC Master Playwright Festival (2001–2021)
- Winnipeg Crankie Festival
- Winnipeg Fringe Theatre Festival
- Winnipeg International Burlesque Festival
