= List of festivals and parades in Montreal =

Festivals of Montreal
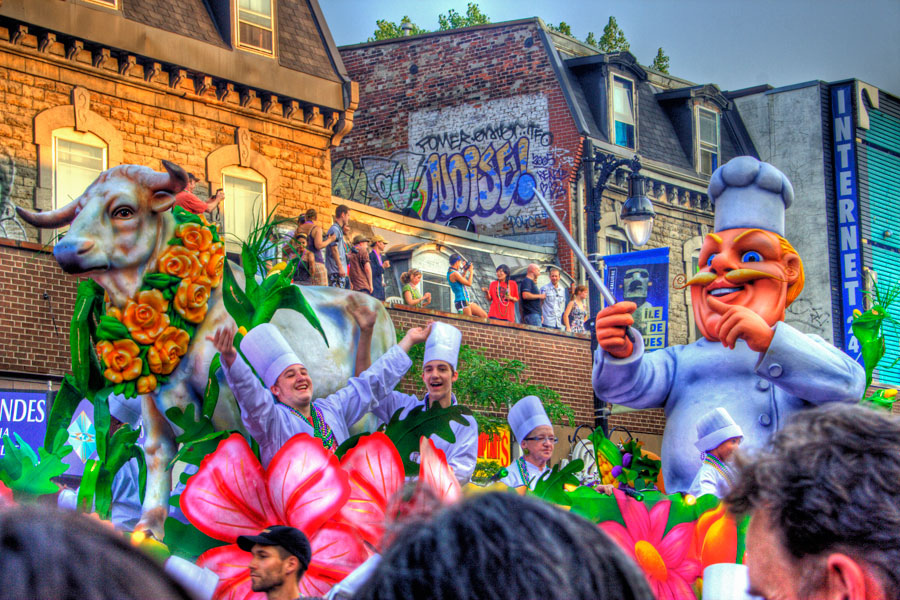

Related topics
- Festivals of Canada; festivals of Quebec; lists of festivals by city (Calgary; Edmonton; Lethbridge; Ottawa; Stirling; Toronto; Vancouver; Winnipeg); culture of Montreal; tourism in Montreal

This is a list of festivals and parades in Montreal, Quebec, Canada. This list includes festivals of diverse types, such as regional festivals, commerce festivals, fairs, food festivals, arts festivals, religious festivals, folk festivals, and recurring festivals on holidays.

== Festivals ==
- Black and Blue Festival gay Circuit party and AIDS research fundraiser
- Blue Metropolis The Montreal International Literary Festival
- Festival SOIR, festival pop up multidisciplinaire
- Fierté Montréal Pride celebrations
- Just for Laughs comedy festival
- L'International des Feux Loto-Québec - International fireworks competition
- Montreal High Lights Festival
- The People's Games
- St-Ambroise Montreal Fringe Festival

=== Culture festivals ===
- Jamaica Day
- Massimadi Festival
- Romani Yag, a Roma/gypsy cultural and musical festival
- Trinidad Day

=== Film and stage festivals ===
- Cinemania
- Fantasia Festival Genre films festival
- iF3 International Freeski Film Festival
- Festival du nouveau cinéma
- Montreal World Film Festival
- Otakuthon, a Japanese animation convention/festival
- Rencontres internationales du documentaire de Montreal

=== Food festivals ===
- Mondial de la Bière, one of North America's largest beer festivals
- Montreal Vegan Festival

=== Music festivals ===
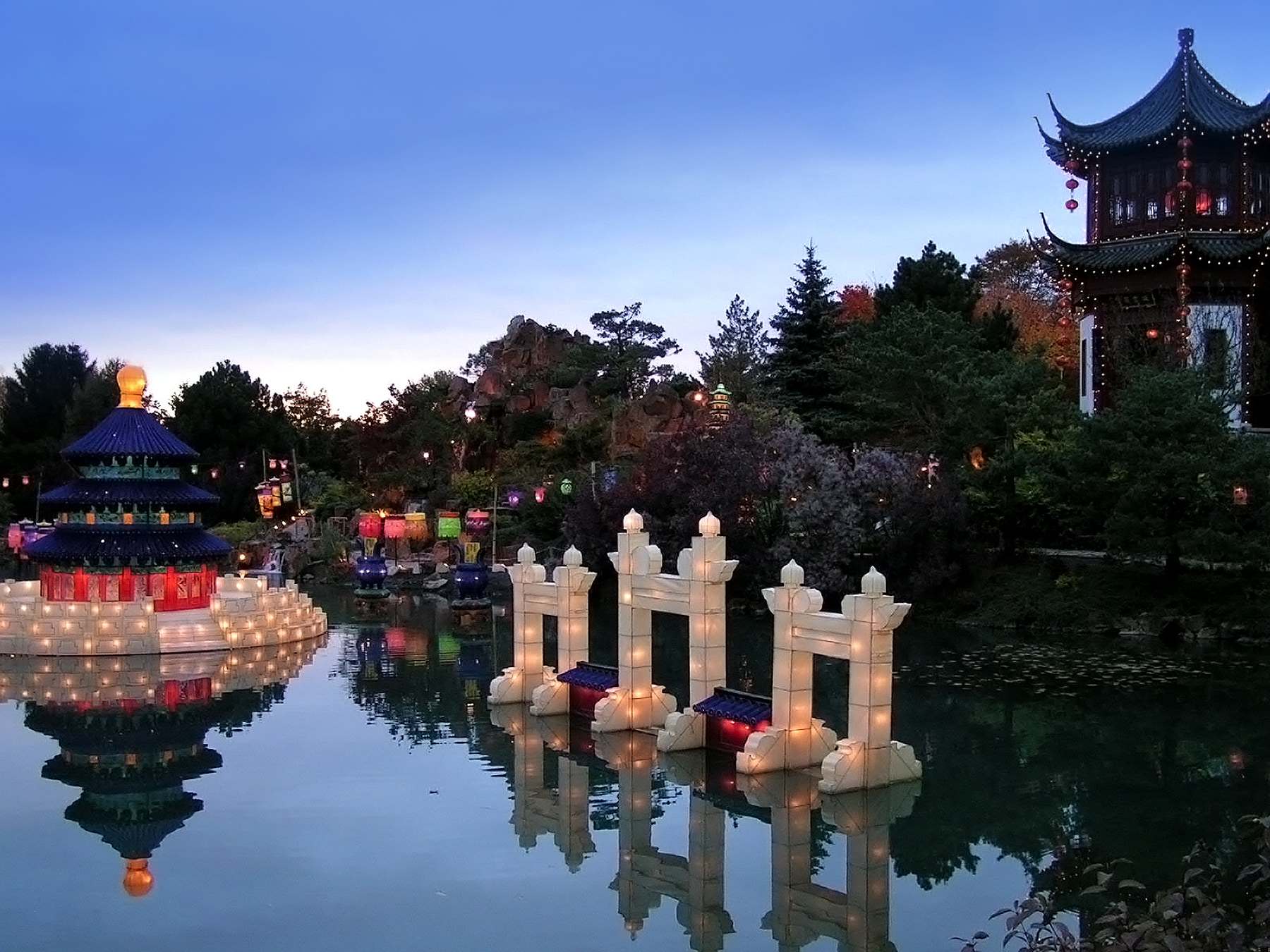

- Amnesia Rockfest, for rock, punk, ska and alternative music
- Festival Bach Montréal,
- FestiBlues international de Montréal, for blues music
- Heavy MTL, for heavy metal and hard rock music
- Igloofest, wintertime outdoor music festival
- ÎleSoniq Music Festival, EDM festival
- Les FrancoFolies de Montréal, French-language music
- Montreal Electronic Groove (MEG) festival, for electronic music
- Montreal Jazz Festival, for jazz music
- Montreal Reggae Festival, for reggae music
- Mutek, electronic and avant-garde music festival
- Osheaga, music festival held annually at Parc Jean-Drapeau
- Piknic Électronik, weekly summertime house music festival
- Pop Montreal, indie-rock festival
- UnPop Montreal indie-rock festival
- Vans Warped Tour, for punk rock music

=== Pop culture festivals ===
- Montreal Comiccon

== Parades in Montreal ==
- Montreal's St. Patrick's Day parade and the Irish in Quebec Montreal's is the oldest St. Patrick's Day Parade in Canada and one of the largest parades in Montreal.
- Greek Independence Day Parade on Hutchison in Jean Talon, it happens right after the St. Patrick's Day Festival. First celebrated on March 25, 1821, this parade gathers numerous Greek schools such as Socrates, and Demostenes for example, and the church groups and the different provinces from Greece, such as the Ionian Islands, the Cyclades and many more. It's expressed as the day that Greece marks its independence from the Ottoman Empire.
- Fête nationale du Québec parade
- Canada Day Parade, celebrating Canada's birthday
- Carifiesta Montreal, a Parade celebrating the Caribbean culture of Montreal
- Twins Parade, a parade hosted by Just For Laughs Festival
- Fierté Montréal, celebrating Montréal's LGBTQ+ community, every third sunday of August.
- Santa Claus parade

== See also ==
- List of festivals in Quebec
- List of festivals in Canada
- Lists of festivals by city
- Culture of Montreal
- Tourism in Montreal
