= Purple City =

Purple City may refer to:

- Purple City Productions, a Harlem-based rap crew
- Purple City Music Festival, a music festival in Edmonton, Alberta
- "Purple City", a local custom at the Alberta Legislature Building, in Edmonton, Canada
