= Medicine Hat Exhibition & Stampede =

Rodeo and exhibition event in Alberta, Canada

Coordinates: 50.0214°N 110.6499°W

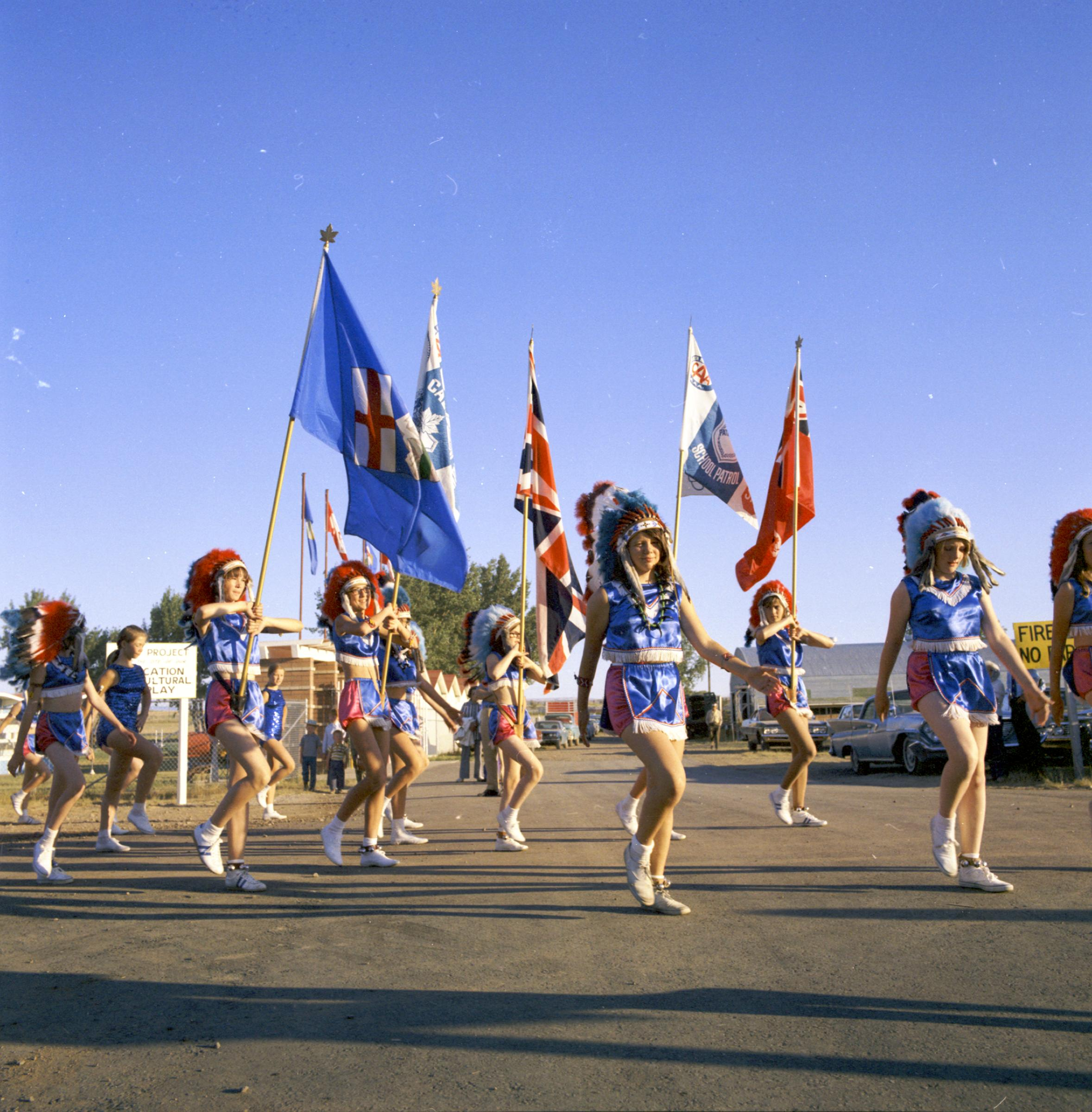
- The Medicine Hat Exhibition and Stampede Parade (1971)
- Date: Last week of July
- Frequency: Annual
- Locations: Medicine Hat, Alberta
- Years active: 1947—present
- Website: https://www.mhstampede.com

The Medicine Hat Exhibition & Stampede is an annual event held in Medicine Hat, Alberta. It is one of the largest and oldest rodeo and exhibition events in Canada. The Stampede has a rich history dating back to the early 20th century and has become an integral part of the Medicine Hat's cultural identity.

== Background ==
The Medicine Hat Exhibition & Stampede has evolved over the years but remains a significant community event that attracts visitors from both the local area and beyond. It typically takes place in late July, providing a week of festivities, entertainment, and celebration for the residents of Medicine Hat and surrounding communities. The Medicine Hat Exhibition and Stampede grew from the town's original agricultural fair, which first took place in 1887; however, it was not until 1947 that the first official event was held under the name "The Medicine Hat Exhibition and Stampede." The 1947 exhibition was organized by President Mack Higden and vice president Dirk Scholten. Scholten ascended to general manager and continued to organize the event from the mid 1940s until the mid 1970s. Following Scholten's retirement, Ralph Murray became general manager. As of 2023, the Medicine Hat Exhibition and Stampede president is Dave Ziegenhagel.

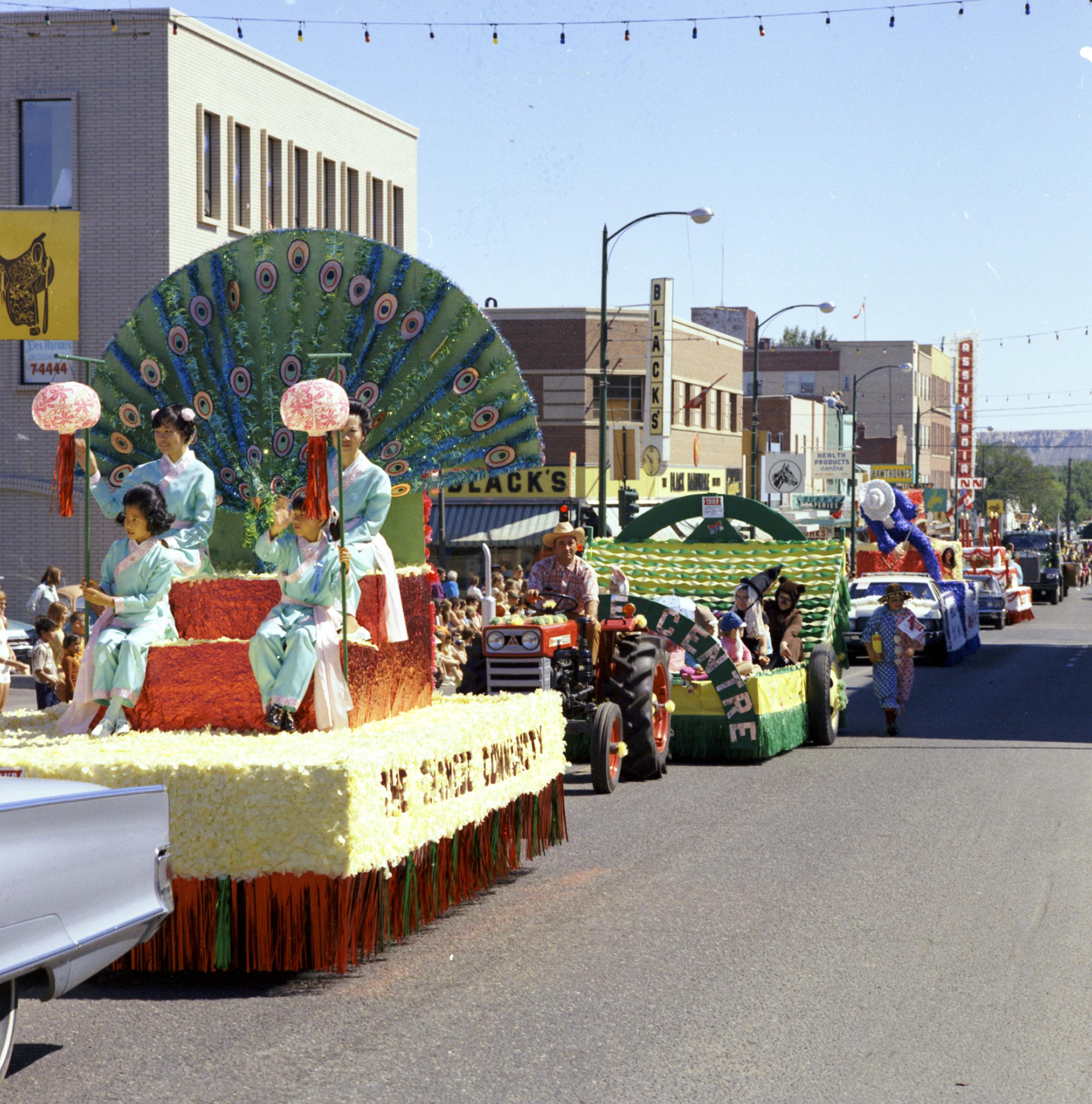
The Medicine Hat Exhibition and Stampede parade in 1971

== Events ==
=== Rodeo ===
The Stampede hosts a variety of traditional rodeo events, such as bull riding, barrel racing, calf roping, steer wrestling, and bronc riding. These events showcase the skills of both local and professional rodeo athletes.

=== Parades and Processions ===
The event often includes colorful parades featuring floats, marching bands, and participants in Western attire. The parades are a highlight for spectators and contribute to the festive atmosphere.

=== Agricultural Exhibitions ===
As an agricultural exhibition, the event provides a platform for farmers, ranchers, and exhibitors to showcase livestock, agricultural products, and equipment. This aspect of the Stampede promotes awareness and appreciation for the region's agricultural heritage.

=== Entertainment ===
In addition to rodeo competitions and agricultural displays, the Stampede typically offers a range of entertainment options, including concerts, live music, and other performances. In 2023, Vanilla Ice was the headlining performer at the Medicine Hat Exhibition.

=== Midway and Amusement Rides ===
Like many traditional exhibitions, the Stampede features a midway with carnival games, amusement rides, and various food vendors. This part of the event is often popular among families and thrill-seekers alike.

=== Cultural and Heritage Exhibits ===
The Stampede often includes exhibits and demonstrations that celebrate the cultural and historical heritage of the region. This include Indigenous heritage displays, historical reenactments, and educational exhibits.

== Gallery ==
Medicine Hat Exhibition & Stampede
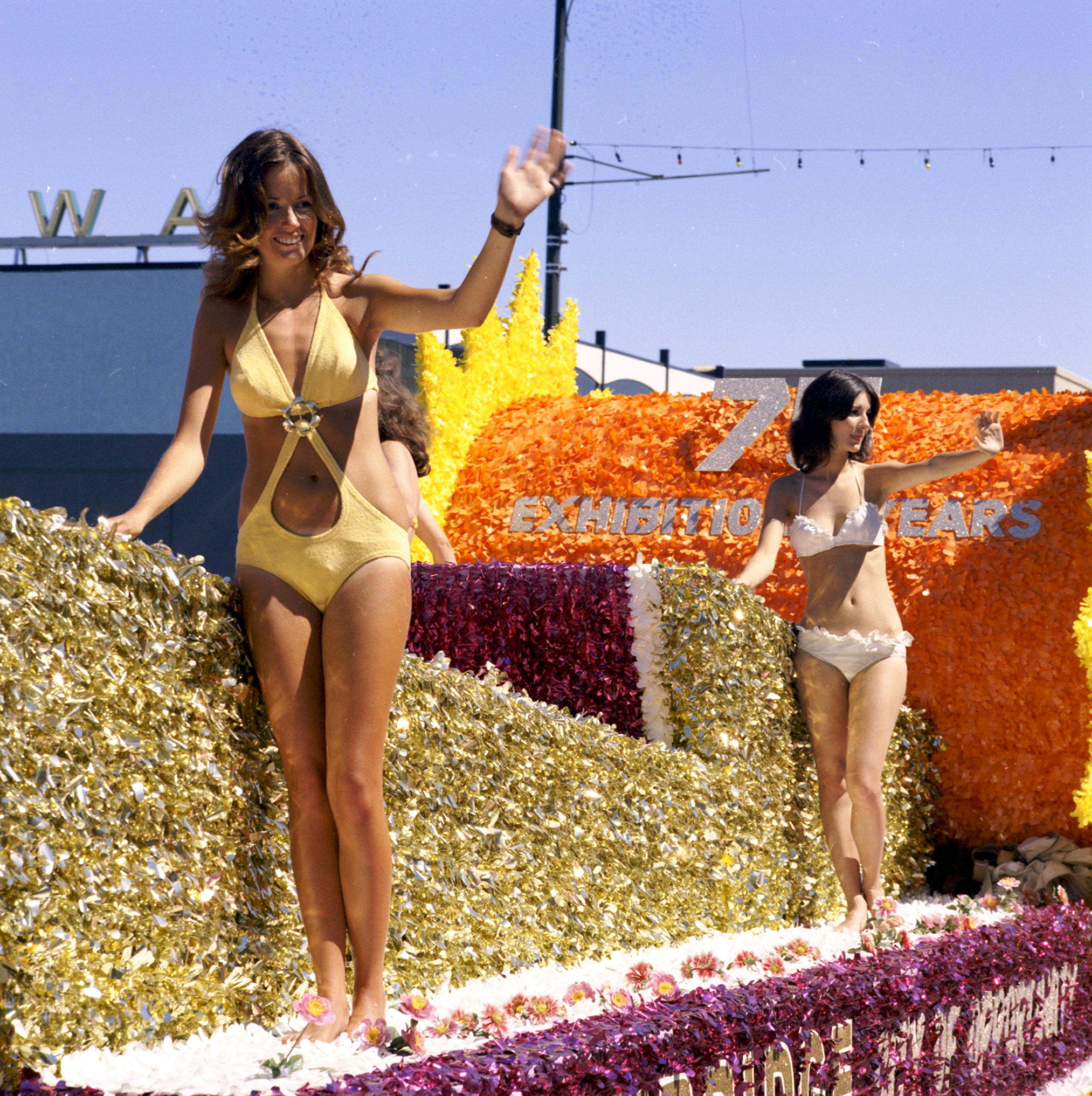
Parade float in 1971

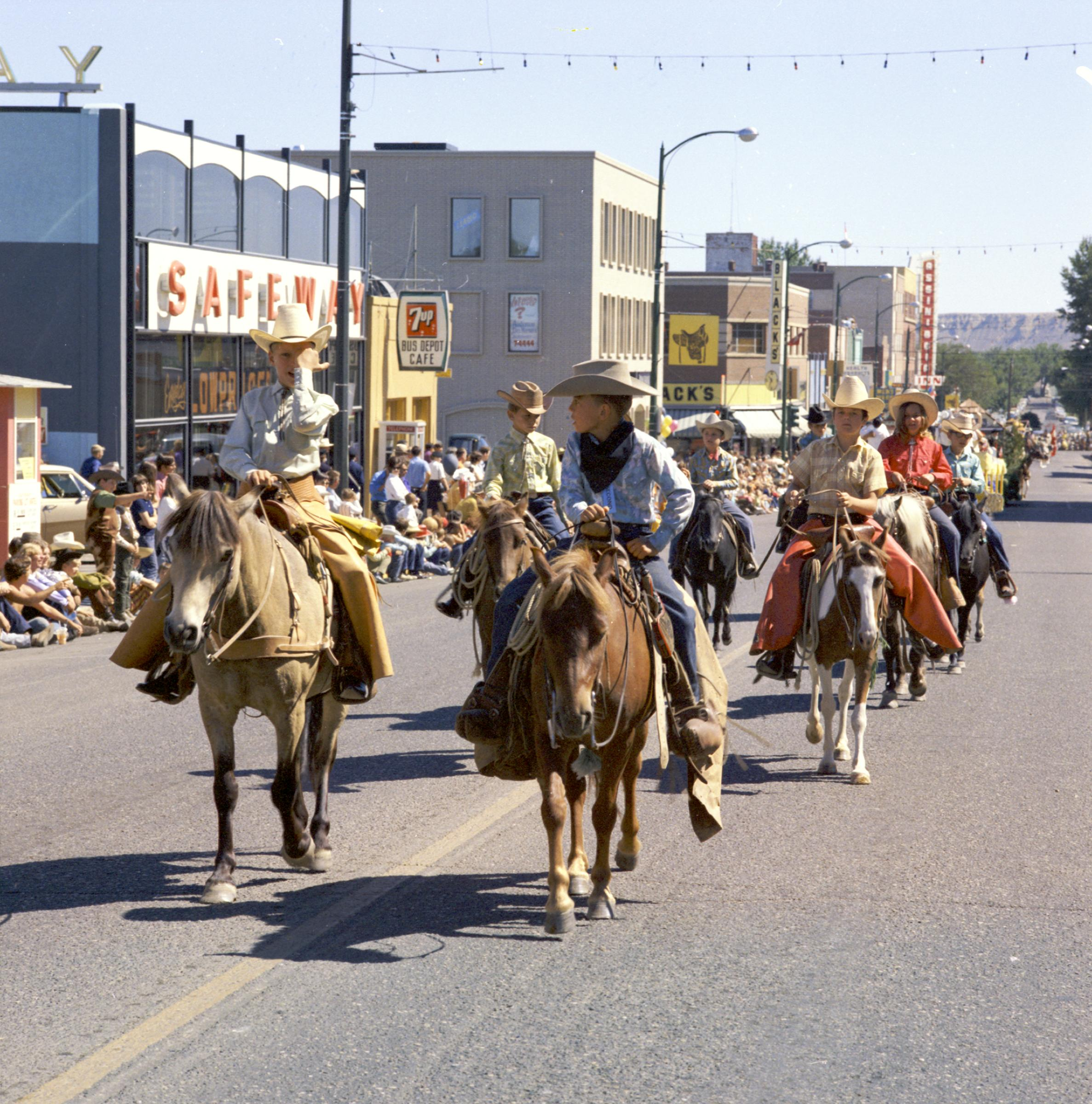
Youth on horseback in the parade

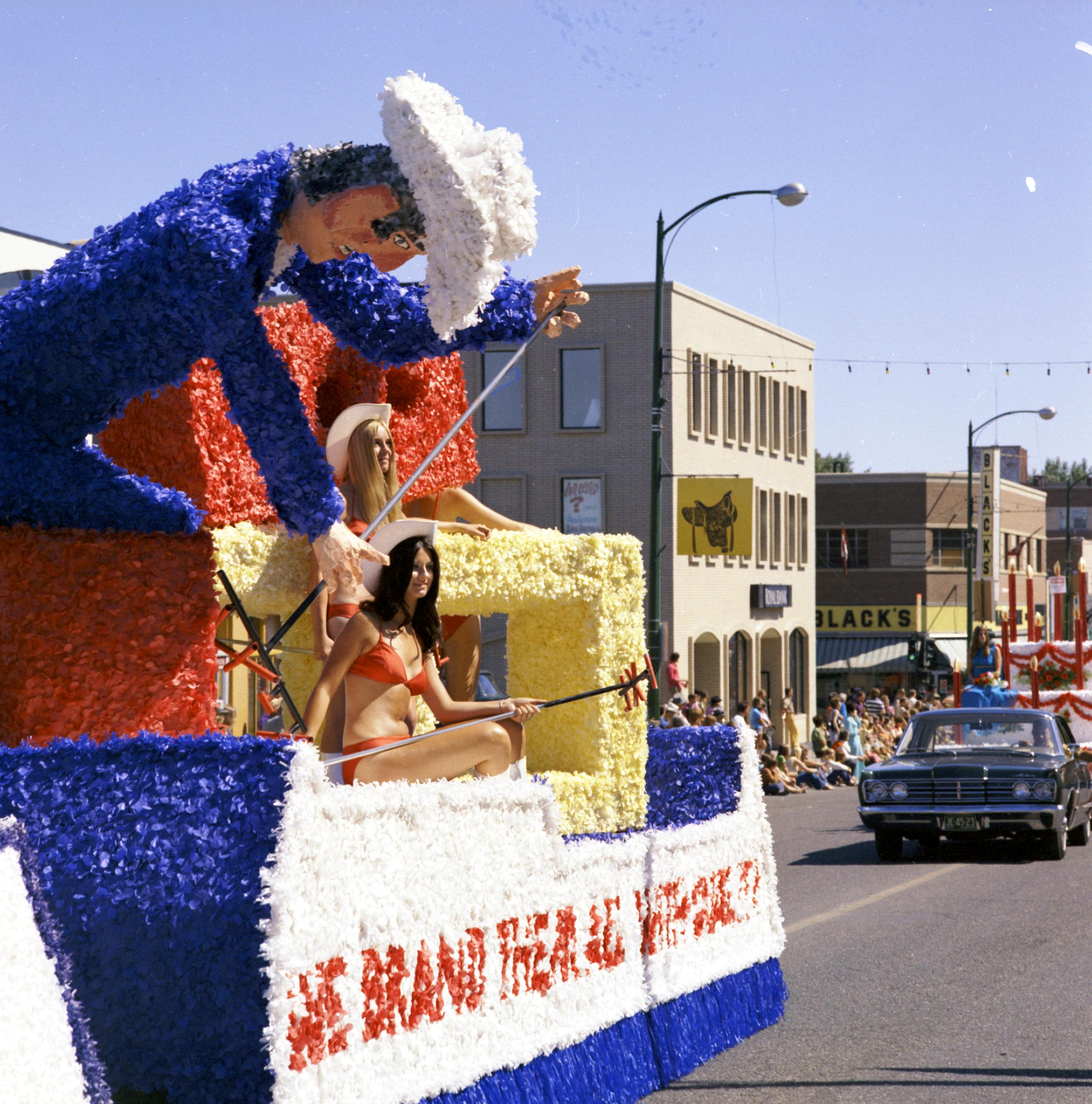
Parade floats

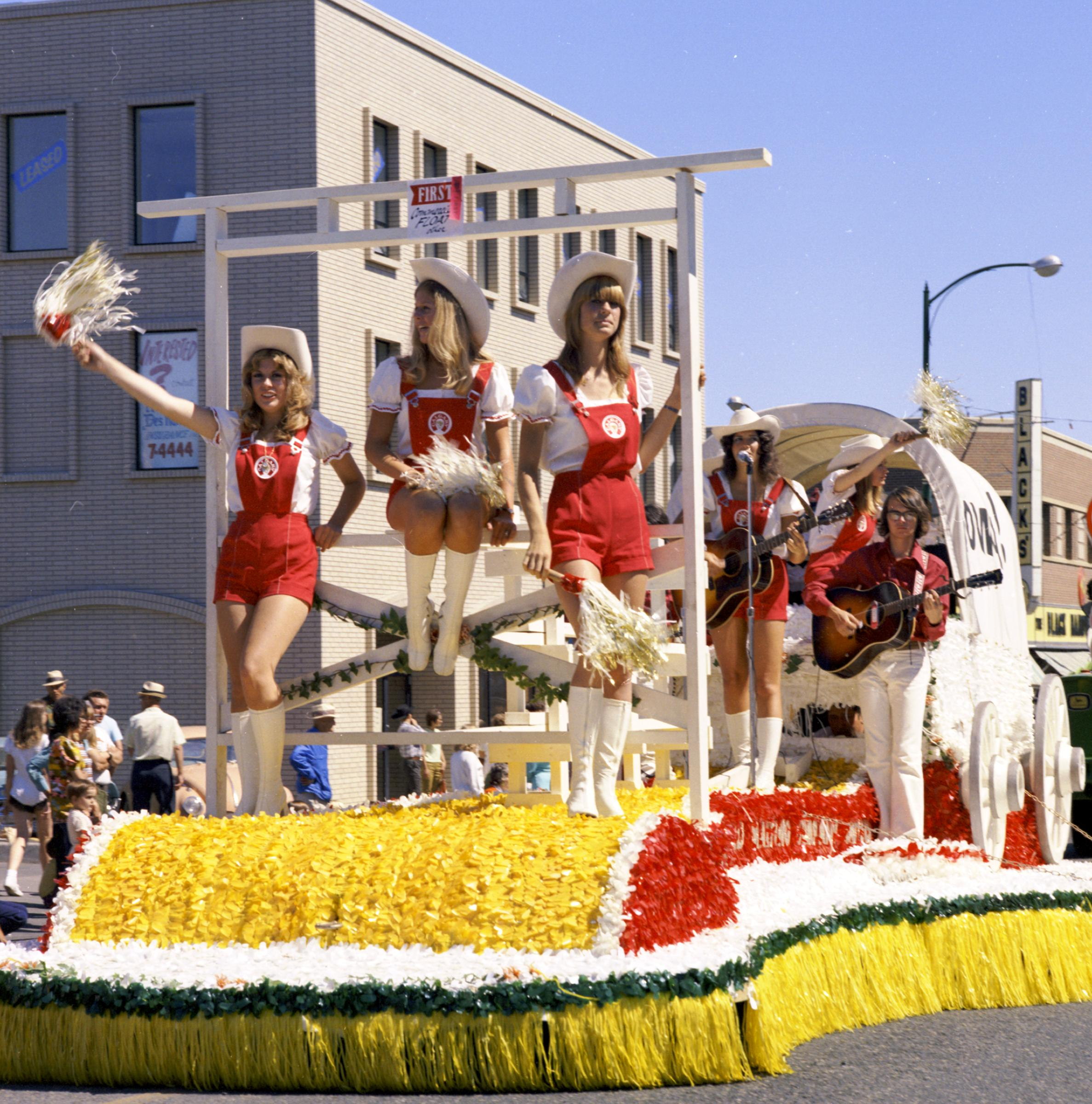
Musicians on a parade float

== See also ==
- Culture of Alberta
- List of festivals in Alberta
- Medicine Hat
