= Green Action Centre =

Green Action Centre (GAC) Formally known as the Recycling Council of Manitoba and the Resource Conservation Manitoba is an environmental, non-profit organization based in Manitoba, Canada. It includes promoting greener living through environmental education for households, workplaces, schools, and communities. It also develops and advocates environmental policies for the Manitoba communities. Its primary areas of activity include; green commuting, composting and waste, sustainable living, and resource conservation.

== History ==
The Green Action Centre (GAC) was founded on February 14, 1985, in Winnipeg, Manitoba, Canada with the goal of promoting recycling and thus reducing landfill. With the support of schools, recycling groups, and municipal officials GAC created recycling depots in various locations around Winnipeg, such as community centers. Much of the work of collecting, sorting, and shipping the recyclables was done by volunteers. The group also met with the City of Winnipeg and Manitoba provincial officials to urge the establishment of a permanent recycling (blue box) program for Winnipeg.

The reinvented organization declared a broader mission in the promotion of ecological sustainability and ventured into new areas beyond waste reduction: climate change, sustainable transportation, and green living. New initiatives were developed and additional staff was hired to conduct programs of public environmental education. GAC formally changed its name from Resource Conservation Manitoba to the Green Action Centre in September 2010. Today, the organization is still involved in a range of environmental initiatives in Manitoba.

== Organization Structure ==
Green Action Centre describes itself as "a non-profit, non-governmental hub for greener living based in Winnipeg, serving Manitoba." It is incorporated as a non-profit corporation under Manitoba legislation and is a federally registered charity. The center is governed by a volunteer Board of Directors elected by members at an annual general meeting. Green Action Centre has a growing list of approximately 2,000 individual supporters. The agency is a member of the Manitoba Eco-Network and Green Communities Canada. Programs and outreach are supported by donations from individuals, grants from foundations and governments, and sponsorships.

== Program areas ==
=== Active and Safe Routes to School ===
The Active and Safe Routes to School program works with schools and communities to help them encourage kids to walk and bike to school. The program promotes active transportation to keep children healthy and safer, and to ensure they have clean air to breathe.

=== Composting ===
Green Action Centre runs a compost promotion project to provide information, resources, and support for composting across Manitoba. They offer free public workshops for residents including backyard composting, winter composting, and worm composting. The organization also coordinates a Master Composter program that provides in-depth training on composting to individuals who become volunteer composting trainers. Green Action Composting also works with schools and communities to develop individualized programs.

=== Environmental Speakers Bureau ===
The Environmental Speakers Bureau offers classroom environmental presentations for schools in Winnipeg. Topics include recycling, litterless lunches, composting, climate change, water, and the concept of the ecological footprint. Presentations are offered for ages ranging from Nursery to Grade 12. The program delivers over 300 presentations annually to schools in Winnipeg and by special arrangement, delivers in-service workshops on environmental education for teachers across Manitoba. This popular school program is supported by the Manitoba Department of Conservation and Water Stewardship and by donations from individuals.

=== Living Green Living Well ===
Living Green Living Well is a program that offers ideas and tips for households, schools, and businesses to help reduce their environmental impact. The project offers presentations to community organizations and workplaces on environmental topics including green cleaning products, climate change, greenwashing, pesticides, sustainable agriculture, and water conservation. The program also runs a blog commenting on environmental news affecting Manitoba.

=== Workplace Commuter Options ===
Green Action Centre works with companies and their employees to promote commuter options other than single-passenger automobiles. The program helps employers develop supportive policies and programs to support biking, busing, carpooling or other forms of transportation that reduce the greenhouse gas impact of commuting. Green Action Centre's Workplace Commuter Options program has worked with:

- Assiniboine Credit Union
- Boeing Winnipeg
- Health Sciences Centre
- Integrated Designs
- International Institute for Sustainable Development
- Manitoba Hydro
- MTS Allstream
- National Leasing
- Public Works and Government Services Canada
- Taylor McCaffrey LLP
- Transport Canada
- United Way of Winnipeg

=== Seasonal programs ===
Green Action Centre runs several seasonal programs throughout the year, often in partnership with national organizations.

==== Car Free Day ====
Green Action Centre is the local coordinator for Car Free Day in Winnipeg. Car Free Day takes place on September 22 each year and is observed in many cities across North America and around the world. The event encourages motorists to leave their cars at home and try an alternative method of commuting for a day.

==== Commuter Challenge ====
The annual Commuter Challenge takes place during Environment Week (the first week of June). It is a fierce but friendly competition that encourages participants at registered workplaces to choose environmentally preferable methods of travel to and from work during the week.

In June 2014, with Green Action Centre's leadership and support, Winnipeg once again won the national Commuter Challenge (for the 11th time in the past 12 years) by registering the highest percentage of green commuters at Winnipeg workplaces during the week. The City of Thompson also won for the third straight year in its population category.

==== Waste Reduction Week ====
Waste Reduction Week is a national event across Canada that encourages businesses, communities, schools, organizations, and individuals to reduce their waste, recycle and undertake other environmentally friendly initiatives. The event takes place during the third week of October each year.

Green Action Centre coordinates activities in Winnipeg for the event and is one of the coordinating organizations across Manitoba.

Green Action Centre receives support for the program from Manitoba Conservation, Manitoba Hydro and the City of Winnipeg Water and Waste Department.

==== Walk to School Month ====
International Walk to School Month ("IWALK") promotes walking and cycling to students during October each year. Green Action Centre coordinates IWALK in Manitoba.

== Policy Committee ==
Green Action Centre has a policy committee made up of board members, staff, and volunteers that develop policies on environmental issues in Manitoba. Some of the policy areas developed by the committee include: waste reduction, pesticides, climate change, land use planning, energy policy, and food and agriculture.
