= Montreal Vegan Festival =

Annual event in Montreal

The Montreal Vegan Festival (French: Festival végane de Montréal) is an annual event that has been taking place in Montreal during each fall since 2014, with the aim to raise awareness about veganism.

== Description ==
The festival's purpose is to familiarize the public with veganism, a way of life consisting in abstaining from the use of animal products, by emphasizing the ethical and environmental reasons for doing so. such a transition. There are only kiosks of companies and non-profit organizations refusing animal exploitation, as well as organizations dedicated to animal welfare and anti-speciesism, as well as conferences and cooking demonstrations.

In its first year in 2014, the festival took place at the Cœur des sciences of the University of Quebec in Montreal, and then at the Marché Bonsecours. Since its inception, entry to the festival has been free.

In its second edition in 2015, the festival welcomed more than 10,000 people and then 15,000 in 2016.

In 2018, it will take place at the Palais des congrès de Montréal.

== Guests and themes ==
On health issues, there have been guests such as renowned Canadian doctor David Jenkins, Michael Greger, Vesanto Melina, Anne-Marie Roy and Tushar Mehta.

In terms of vegan athletes, the festival welcomed hockey player Georges Laraque, Olympic skier Seba Johnson, Antoine Jolicoeur Desroches, swimmer Xavier Desharnais and skater Meagan Duhamel.

== See also ==
- Veganism
- List of festivals and parades in Montreal
