= Cowboys Park =

Skatepark in Calgary, Alberta, Canada

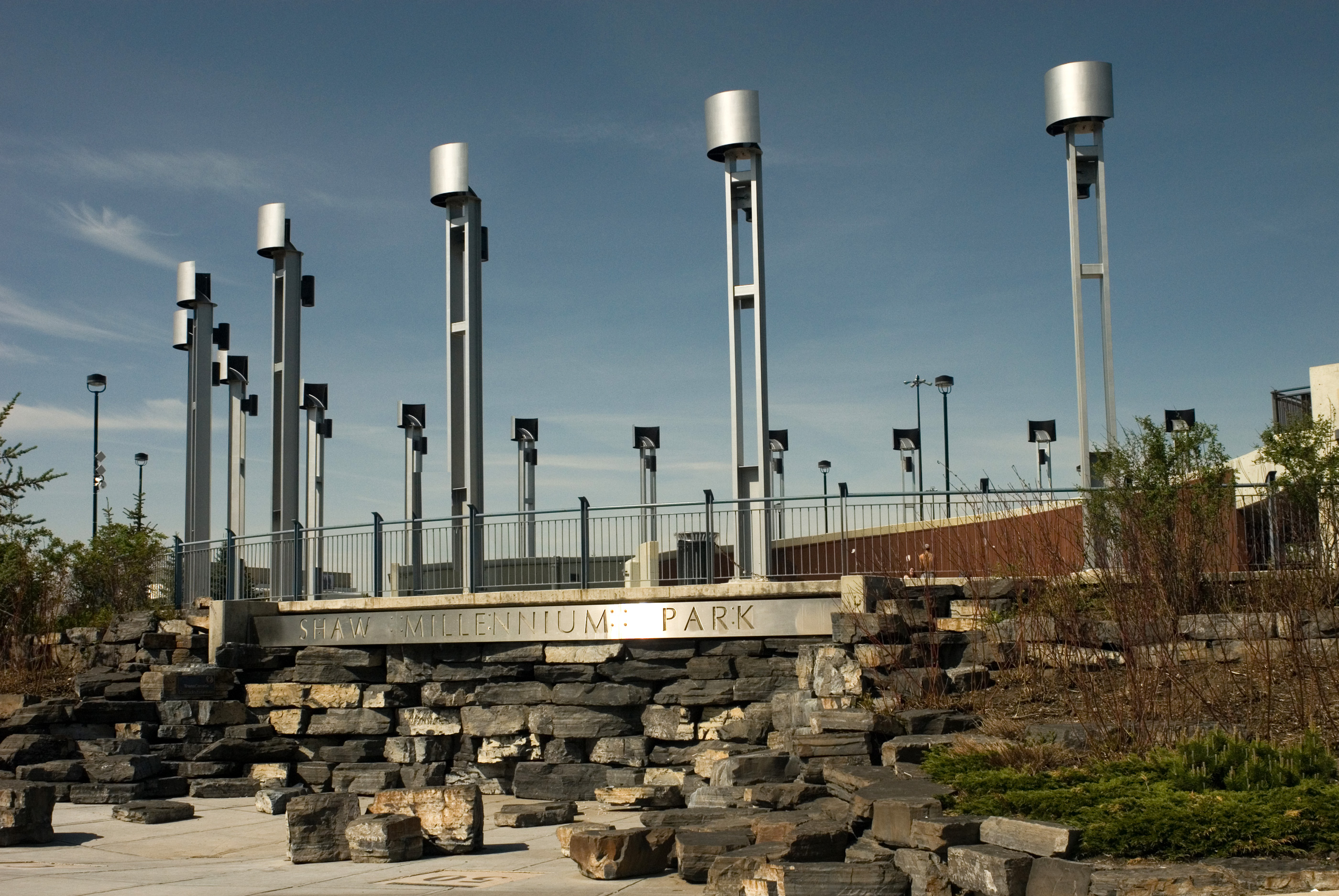
- Shaw Millennium Park
- Interactive map of Cowboys Park
- Type: Skatepark
- Location: Calgary, Alberta, Canada
- Coordinates: 51°02′46″N 114°05′31″W
- Area: 17.3 acres (0.070 km^{2})
- Created: 2000
- Operator: City of Calgary
- Status: Open year round

Cowboys Park, formerly Shaw Millennium Park and Mewata Park, is a skatepark on the western end of downtown Calgary in Alberta, Canada, on the site of the former Mewata Stadium adjacent to Mewata Armouries.

The 7,000-square-metre (75,000 sq ft) skatepark was built in 2000, and was the largest park of its kind in Canada. The park is sponsored by Penny Lane Entertainment. The skatepark is maintained by the City of Calgary Recreation Department.

It consists of a street course with ledges, flatbars, stairs and transitions, an intermediate course with rails down stairs and banks, and an advanced course with cloverleaf bowl, street course and a large fullpipe.

In July 2024, the park rebranded to Cowboys Park through a 10-year sponsorship agreement with Penny Lane Entertainment.

The facility is also used to host events such as the Calgary International Reggae Festival and Cowboys Music Festival.

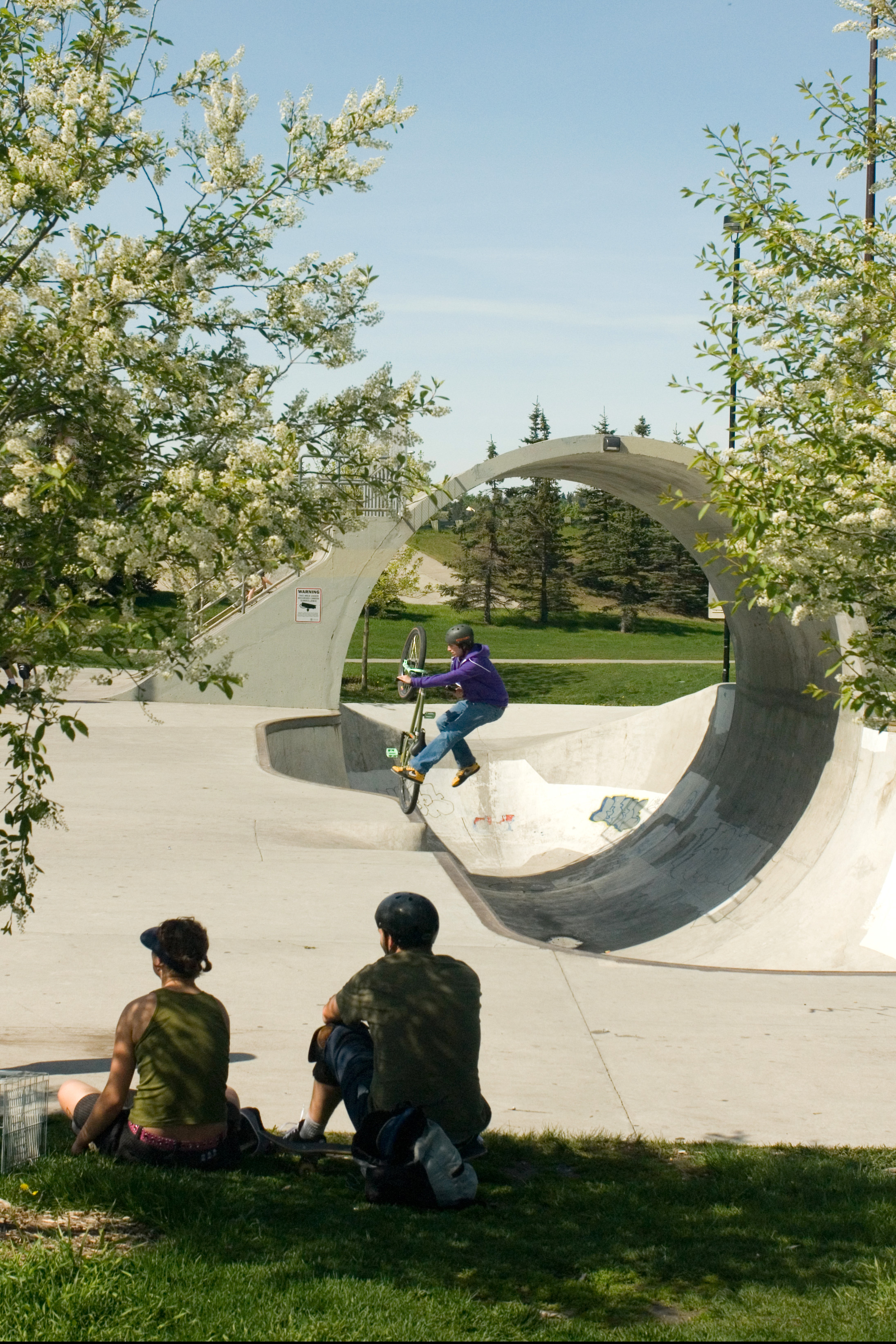
The Fullpipe at Cowboys Park
