= Calgary Underground Film Festival =

Annual film festival in Alberta, Canada

Coordinates: 51.045°N 114.057°W

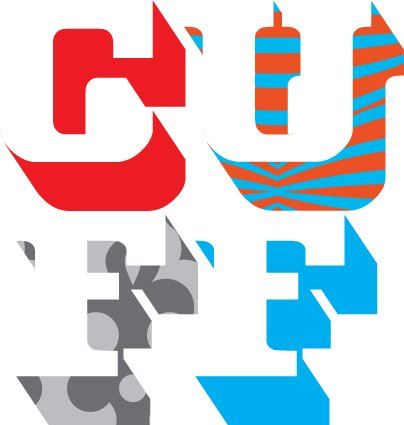
- Location: Calgary, Alberta, Canada
- Founded: 2003
- Festival date: mid-April
- Website: www.calgaryundergroundfilm.org

The Calgary Underground Film Festival (CUFF) is a film festival held annually in Calgary, Alberta, Canada, for seven days at the downtown Globe Cinema. Founded in 2003, Calgary Underground Film Festival is a not-for-profit organization screening films that defy convention.

CUFF currently has two annual festivals. The main Calgary Underground Film Festival runs for seven days in mid-April, while the CUFF.Docs International Documentary Festival is in November. They also showcase special event screenings throughout the year.

CUFF introduces audiences to the people behind the lens by showcasing local and international indie filmmakers. It showcases a roster of films rarely seen in North American theatres, screening contemporary works in various categories (feature, documentary, animation, and shorts), and all genres (horror, sci-fi, fantasy, comedies, thrillers, and music-related films).

== Festival awards ==
A panel of local and visiting industry professionals choose their top picks of the festival. Additionally, at each screening, CUFF audiences receive ballots to submit their own festival favourites.

Audience Award

- BEST FILM

Jury Awards

- BEST NARRATIVE FEATURE
- BEST DOCUMENTARY FEATURE
- BEST CANADIAN SHORT

== 12-Hour Halloween Movie Marathon ==
Since 2015, CUFF has presented an all-night Halloween Movie Marathon at The Globe Cinema in Calgary. The event runs from 7pm to 7am and includes a costume contest, a pizza party and free cereal for those who make it until the morning.

== 48-Hour Movie-Making Challenge ==
Until 2015, CUFF ran a 48-Hour Movie-Making Challenge that gave young and emerging filmmakers an opportunity to produce a short film in 48 hours. The completed shorts were to be shown at the following Calgary Underground Film Festival.

== See also ==
- List of festivals in Calgary
- Festivals in Alberta
