= Winnipeg International Jazz Festival =

Canadian jazz festival in Manitoba

TD Winnipeg International Jazz Festival
- Genre: Jazz
- Dates: June
- Locations: Winnipeg, Manitoba, Canada
- Coordinates: 49.8979°N 97.1407°W
- Years active: 1989-2019, 2021–present
- Website: jazzwinnipeg.com

The TD Winnipeg International Jazz Festival is a Canadian jazz festival first held in 1989 in Winnipeg, Manitoba. It is usually held in June.

The festival, organized by the Jazz Winnipeg organization and formerly called the Jazz Winnipeg Festival, features Canadian and international musicians in several jazz genres. The festival holds ticketed events in various Winnipeg venues and free concerts in the Old Market Square in Winnipeg's historic Exchange District. Jazz Winnipeg also hosts jazz concerts throughout the year.

Past performers include George Benson, Preservation Hall Jazz Band, Dave Brubeck, Charlie Haden, Herbie Hancock, Joe Henderson, Dave Holland, Wynton Marsalis, Sonny Rollins, Wayne Shorter, McCoy Tyner, Bobby McFerrin, Buster Williams, Christian McBride, Cecile McLorin Salvant, Vijay Iyer and Kamasi Washington, as well as non-jazz artists such as The Roots, Booker T. Jones, The Neville Brothers, St. Vincent, and Al Green.

This festival went virtual in 2020, and resumed the next year.
