= Tourism in Montreal =

Tourism is an important industry in Montreal, Quebec, Canada. The city welcomed 10.2 million overnight visitors in 2016 and 11,792,970 day trip visitors in 2010. Montreal attracted 1,770,939 international overnight visitors in 2010, most of them from the United States, France, the United Kingdom, Germany, Mexico and Japan. 82,740 direct jobs and 48,199 indirect jobs in Montreal were generated by the tourism industry in 2014.

Crescent Street in Downtown Montreal is popular among tourists. Throughout the summer, it features various street fairs and festivals. Among locals, Crescent Street is known better for its many clubs and bars. Saint-Laurent Boulevard and the surrounding Plateau Mont-Royal neighbourhood are also well known for their nightlife, with many bars, nightclubs and restaurants.

The main sectors that attract tourism in Montreal are Festivals drawing in 7.5 million tourists, museums accounting for 7 million visits and Old Montreal bringing in 2.5 million tourists in the year 2013.

== Attractions ==
Visitors by tourist attraction
Rank	Attraction	2011	2010	Variation 11/10
1	Old Port of Montreal	6,601,278	6,198,646	6.5%
2	Casino de Montréal	5,640,873	5,895,835	-4.3%
3	Bell Centre	1,868,056	2,056,343	-9.1%
4	Montreal Biodome	815,810	268,558	203.8%
5	Montreal Science Centre	764,405	656,205	16.5%
6	Montreal Museum of Fine Arts	758,211	517,953	46.4%
7	Bonsecours Market	747,004	800,490	-6.7%
8	Montreal Botanical Garden and Montreal Insectarium	695,404	740,915	-12.9%
9	Notre-Dame Basilica	431,174	416,978	3.4%
10	Pointe-à-Callière Museum	353,503	389,949	-9.3%
11	Olympic Park	275,937	240,427	14.8%
12	Musée d'art contemporain de Montréal	241,527	220,764	9.4%
13	Marguerite Bourgeoys Museum	175,843	204,987	-14.2%
14	1000 de La Gauchetière	96,995	204,987	10.4%
15	Montreal Biosphère	87,624	100,175	-12.5%
16	McCord Museum	79,082	77,087	2.6%
17	Maison Saint-Gabriel	74,268	77,087	10.2%
18	Dow Planetarium (now closed and replaced by the new planetarium)	72,517	94,138	-23%
19	Canadian Centre for Architecture	67,666	67,655	0%
20	Centre d'histoire de Montréal	60,258	58,055	3.8%
21	Château Ramezay	46,382	38,469	20.6%
22	Stewart Museum	4,346	N/A	N/A
