= Artifact Small Format Film Festival =

Canadian celluloid-based film festival held in Calgary

- Genre: Art
- Dates: March
- Locations: Calgary, Alberta
- Years active: 26
- Founded: 1992
- Patron: Calgary Society of Independent Filmmakers (CSIF)
- Website: www.artifactfilmfestival.com

The Artifact Small Format Film Festival (formerly the $100 Film Festival) is Calgary's only celluloid-based film festival. When the $100 Film Festival was born in 1992, it showcased eight short films on Super 8. The name sprung from the challenge to shoot a short film on four rolls of Super 8 – which tallied to the cost of $100. In following years, the festival dropped the budgetary limit and allowed 16 mm film, which shifted the focus from low budget to quality small-format films. Thus, the name was changed to the Artifact Small Format Film Festival in 2017 so as to better represent the festival's role as an international celebration of creative story telling on celluloid.

Over the years, Artifact has expanded to include the popular Film/Music Explosion!, commission projects, and various partnerships.

Artifact is one of only a handful of festivals worldwide that exhibit exclusively on small-format celluloid.
