= Canadian International Comedy Film Festival =

Film festival in Winnipeg, Manitoba, Canada

- Status: Active
- Frequency: Annually
- Locations: Winnipeg, Manitoba, Canada
- Established: 2013; 13 years ago
- Founders: Andrew Wall and David Rabsch
- Previous event: October 8, 2022
- Next event: TBD
- Sponsor: Winnipeg Film Group
- Website: https://www.cicff.ca/

The Canadian International Comedy Film Festival (CICFF), formerly the Shärt International Comedy Film Festival (SICFF), is a comedy film festival that takes place in Winnipeg, Manitoba, Canada, each February.

The 10th festival took place on 8 October 2022, at the Cinematheque theatre and the Park Theatre.

== History ==
The festival was established by Andrew Wall and David Rabsch in 2013 as the Shärt International Comedy Film Festival (SICFF), funded through a grant by a Winnipeg family via the Shärt Foundation. The festival acrimoniously parted ways with the Foundation in 2018 and, following legal proceedings during that year's festival, it was revived in 2019 as the Canadian International Comedy Film Festival.

The 8th festival was scheduled for 29 February 2020, to take place at the Park Theatre, Winnipeg.

== Awards ==
The awards offered (as of 2022) are:

- Best Canadian Comedy Film Award — Best film from a Canadian filmmaker
- Best International Comedy Film Award — Best comedy film from a country other than Canada
- Best Mockumentary Award — The best comedic documentary-style film
- Peoples Choice Award — Best film as chosen by the audience as well as online voters during the festival
- Rom Com Award — Best romantic comedy film
- The Select Award — "The film most loved by the CICFF board of governors"
- Shorty Award — The best film under 1 minute

In addition to the above, the festival also occasionally gives special awards depending on the film and year.

=== Winners ===
==== 2021 ====
Award	Film	Filmmaker(s)	Country of origin
Select Trophy Award	Meanwhile, at the Abandoned Factory…	Michael Cusack	Australia
Best Canadian Film Award	The Date	Taylor Olson (director) Bob Mann (writer)	Canada
Best International Film Award	Cash Stash	Martin Darondeau and Enya Baroux	France
Shorty Award	Follow	Yoh Komaya	Japan
Best Mockumentary Award	Planet Nature World: Muskoka	Josef Beeby (director) Josef Beeby, Leete Stetson, Grace Smith (writers)	Canada
Local Hero Award	Mort Through the Looking Glass	Luke Whitmore (director) Luke Whitmore, Tony Hinds (writers)	Canada
Spirit Award	That Was Awesome!	Arlen Konopaki (director) Kevin Gillese (writer)	USA
Best Rom Com Award	Coffee With Exes	Brett A. Hart (director) Jessica Bishop (writer)	USA
Best Stand-Up Award	Story Time with Joey Rinaldi	Louis Kent (director) Joey Rinaldi (writer)	USA
Best Electrocution of a Child	Truth Hertz	Shaun Majumder	Canada
Best Musical Award	Naked Pictures	Michael Coburn (director) Rhiannon Hopkins (writer)	UK
Best Canadian Feature Award	Wharf Rats	Jason Arsenault (director) Robbie Carruthers, Jason Arsenault, Dennis Trainor (writers)	Canada
Best International Feature Award	Pretty Men (My Bittersweet Life)	Kim Jung Wook (director) Lee Byoung Hyun (writer)	S. Korea
Best Romantic Feature Award	Cream	Nóra Lakos (director) Fruzsina Fekete, Nóra Lakos, Yvonne Kerékgyártó (writers)	Hungary

==== 2019 ====
Award	Film	Filmmaker(s)	Country of origin
Select Trophy Award	Opening Night	Ryan Glista	USA
Peoples Choice Award	Party Animal	Trevor Kristjanson	Canada
Best Rom Com Award	Mind F*#k	Sherill Turner & Louise Munro	UK
Shorty Award	Quick Thoughts About Rainbows	Ian Johnston	Canada
Best Mockumentary Award	The Lightsaber Maker	Jeremy Brown	Canada
Best Canadian Film Award	Cahoots	Jon Mann	Canada
Best International Film Award	Ladylike	Tel Benjamin	Australia

==== 2018 ====
Award	Film	Filmmaker(s)	Country of origin
Select Trophy Award	Jim’s a Pineapple	Blake Fraser	Australia
Peoples Choice Award	Fun Fun Street	Carter Hadlow & Jared Adams	Canada
Best Rom Com Award	Rekindled	Erin Brown Thomas	USA
