= Big Valley Jamboree =

Annual country music festival in Alberta, Canada

- Genre: Country music
- Dates: July 30 – August 2, 2026
- Locations: Camrose, Alberta, Canada
- Years active: 1992–present
- Website: bigvalleyjamboree.com

The Big Valley Jamboree, commonly referred to as BVJ, is an annual country music festival held in Camrose, Alberta, Canada. Established in 1992, the event takes place during the Civic Holiday in August at the Camrose Regional Exhibition grounds and combines concerts, camping, and other festival programming. Since moving to Camrose in 1993, the festival has become one of the city's largest recurring events and has drawn major Canadian and American country artists.

== History ==
The Big Valley Jamboree began in 1992 as an Alberta counterpart to the Big Valley Jamboree in Craven, Saskatchewan, now known as Country Thunder Saskatchewan. The first Alberta event was held near Big Valley, Alberta, and included a September rock concert headlined by Bryan Adams. The inaugural event was affected by early snowfall and limited site services, leading promoters to seek a new venue for the following year.

In 1993, organizers moved the festival to Camrose, Alberta, where the Camrose Regional Exhibition was seeking to revive its annual summer fair. The exhibition board cancelled the fair in favour of hosting the Big Valley Jamboree, which was reoriented as a country music festival held over the August long weekend. The first Camrose edition included performers such as Ricky Van Shelton, Don Williams, Clint Black, and Tanya Tucker.

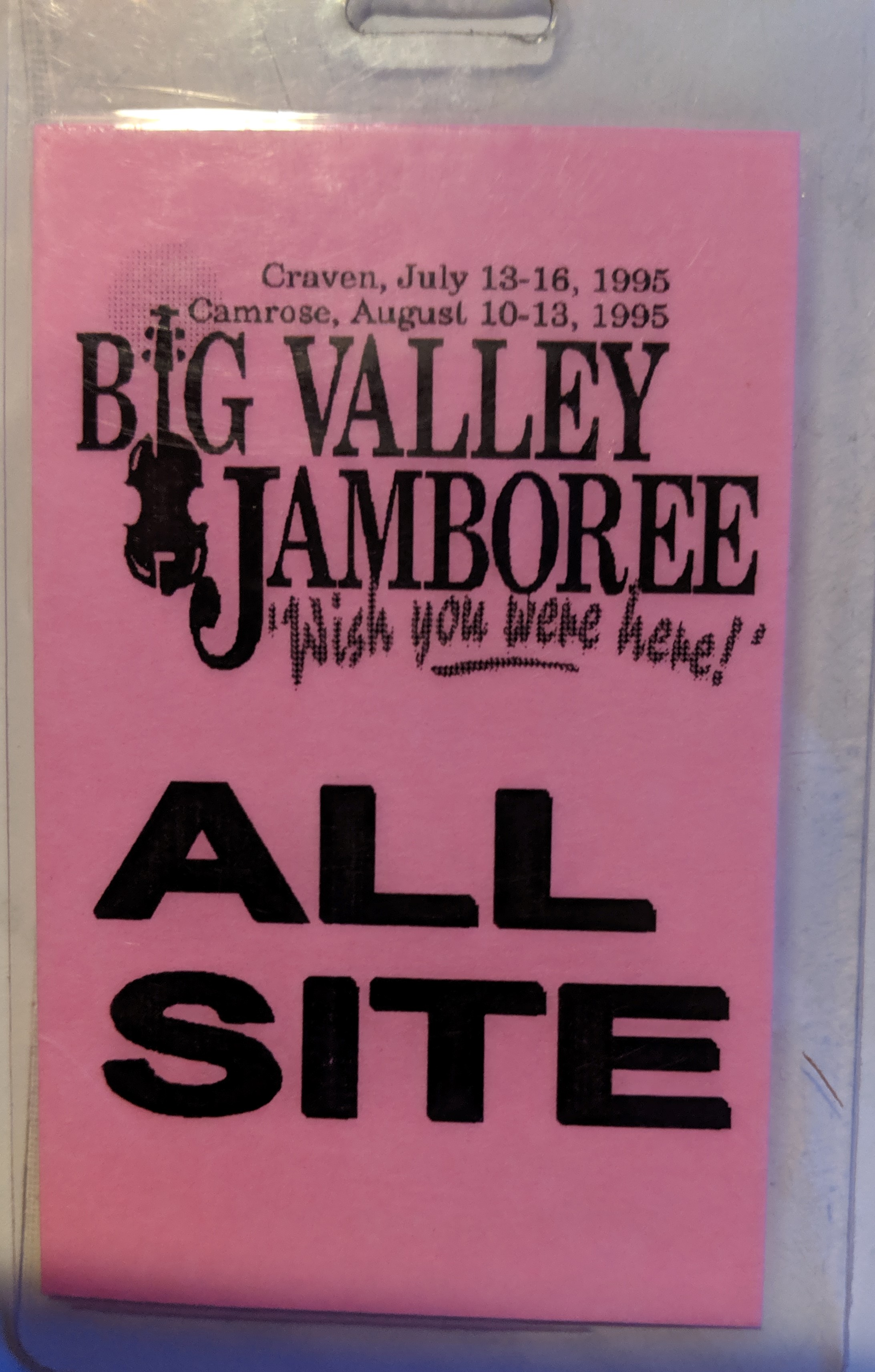
Backstage pass for the 1995 Craven and Camrose events

Over the following decades, BVJ grew into a major camping and country music festival. Its lineups have included prominent American country acts such as Alabama, Brooks & Dunn, Loretta Lynn, Willie Nelson, Reba McEntire, Tim McGraw, Shania Twain, Toby Keith, Brad Paisley, Keith Urban, Carrie Underwood, Miranda Lambert, Blake Shelton, Eric Church, Luke Bryan, Jason Aldean, Luke Combs, Morgan Wallen, Lainey Wilson, Zac Brown Band, Rascal Flatts, Lady A, Dierks Bentley, Alan Jackson, Dwight Yoakam, Charley Pride, Tanya Tucker, Martina McBride, LeAnn Rimes, Kacey Musgraves, Darius Rucker, Randy Travis, and the Oak Ridge Boys. Canadian performers have included Paul Brandt, Terri Clark, Michelle Wright, Ian Tyson, Blue Rodeo, Dallas Smith, Dean Brody, Brett Kissel, High Valley, Corb Lund, Johnny Reid, Gord Bamford, the Washboard Union, the Reklaws, Tenille Townes, and the Dead South.

=== 2009 stage collapse ===
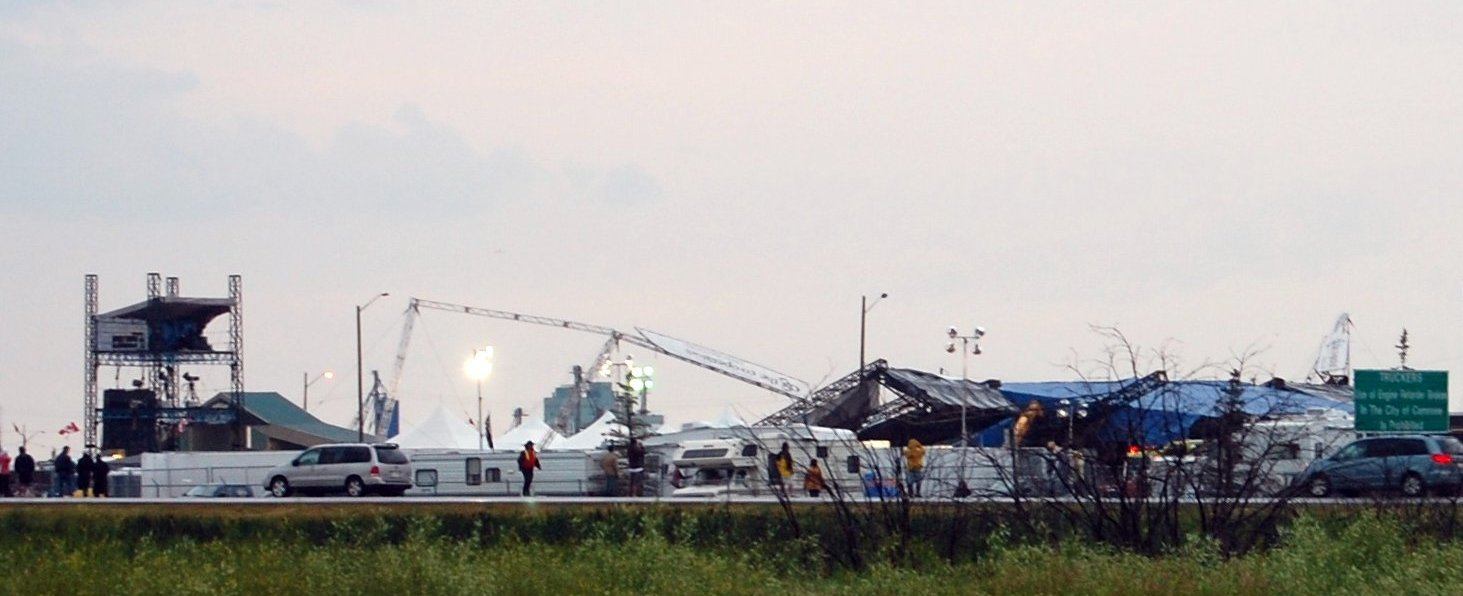
Remote view of the collapsed stage, 2009

On August 1, 2009, a large storm with winds from 60 to 100 kilometres per hour (37 to 62 mph) caused the collapse of the main stage, killing one person and injuring at least fifteen others, four critically. Producers of the Jamboree estimated that seventy-five people were treated for injuries. The storm hit while Billy Currington was on stage. Currington and his bass guitarist were injured. Actor and musician Kevin Costner was scheduled to play later and became trapped under the stage when it collapsed. Organizers had just postponed the concert and were in the process of clearing spectators from the concert area, when a storm front hit, causing the collapse. Environment Canada had issued a severe thunderstorm warning for the Camrose area earlier; however, the organizers were not advised until just before the storm hit and thus did not alert concertgoers. The final day of the festival was cancelled.

In 2011, the Government of Alberta announced that 33 charges had been laid against three companies under the province's Occupational Health and Safety Act in connection with the collapse. A public fatality inquiry later concluded that the stage came down during high winds and recommended improved standards for the design, inspection, and use of temporary stages.

== Economic impact and recognition ==
A 2011 economic impact study commissioned by Alberta Tourism, Parks and Recreation estimated that operational expenditures to organize and support the festival in Camrose totalled approximately C$5.9 million, including wages and salaries. The report described the festival as Camrose's largest and most prominent annual gathering of country music artists and attendees.

The Big Valley Jamboree has received the Canadian Country Music Association award for Country Music Event of the Year multiple times, including in 2001, 2004, 2006, 2009, and 2010.

== See also ==
- List of country music festivals
- Festivals in Alberta
