= North Country Fair =

- Status: active
- Genre: folk music festival
- Frequency: Annually
- Locations: near Driftpile, Alberta, Canada
- Coordinates: 55.3085°N 115.8480°W
- Most recent: 2026-06-21
- Next event: 2027-06-18
- Website: northcountryfair.ca

The North Country Fair is an annual summer Solstice celebration held in the Driftpile Valley near Driftpile in northern Alberta, Canada.

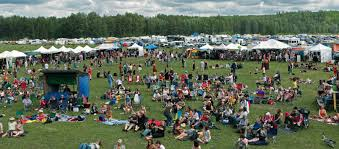
Crowd shot at the Fair
