= Commuter Challenge =

Annual week-long event in Canada

The Commuter Challenge is a week-long national event in Canada that is held annually during the Canadian Environment Week. Formatted as a friendly competition between workplaces and Canadian municipalities, the national and host city coordinators announce winners based on the highest percent participation. The event has a strong workplace focus where employers promote the event in-house to support their employees in leaving their cars at home in favour of more sustainable modes of commuting, such as walking, jogging, cycling, in-line skating, public transit, carpooling and remote work.

The first Commuter Challenge was hosted in 1991 and the Canadian Commuter Challenge tracking tool was launched in 1999 and is currently coordinated nationally by the Calgary-based environmental group, the Sustainable Alberta Association. Participants record their commutes and are ranked via Sustainable Alberta Association's web-based tracking tools. In 2014, Commuter Challenge drew participation from over 26,675 individuals and 1,803 workplaces.

== History ==
Small sustainable transportation events started emerging in Canada in the early 1990s in different cities across the country; all under different names and in different formats.

=== Ottawa-Gatineau ===
In 1991, cyclists from Ottawa and Hull, Quebec, organized the first commuter challenge in the National Capital Region. The annual event was founded by Mike Buckthought, a programmer-analyst and avid cyclist. During National Environment Week, participants from Environment Canada and Forestry Canada reduced greenhouse gas emissions by an estimated one tonne of carbon dioxide. Reductions in emissions were estimated using Environment Canada's Mobile 4C model.

In 1992, the challenge expanded to include four organizations in Ottawa-Hull (Environment Canada, Forestry Canada, Bell Canada, and Bell-Northern Research). Participants reduced greenhouse gas emissions by an estimated 8 tonnes of carbon dioxide.

In 1995, the event expanded to include the first intercity challenge, with Ottawa-Hull competing against London, Ontario. That year, the event included participants from Ottawa-Hull and London, as well as other cities in Ontario, British Columbia and the United States. Reductions in emissions were estimated using Environment Canada's Mobile 5C model. On May 18, 1995, participants reduced emissions by an estimated 5 tonnes of carbon dioxide.

=== Calgary ===
In 1991 in Calgary, Andrea Main, then curator of the ERCB's Energeum (Energy Resources Conservation Board, now Alberta Energy Utilities Board), organized an interdepartmental competition to promote alternative transportation options for that year's National Environment Week.

In 1992, the ERCB challenged three other energy companies in Calgary to a friendly competition to see which workplace had the highest percent of sustainable commuters.

By 1995, the Calgary Challenge had mushroomed to include 25 workplaces, primarily oil and gas companies.^{[4]} Andrea Main drafted the original proposal for the challenge and coined the name "Calgary Commuter Challenge". In its inaugural year, the ERCB's Gas Department won the competition — the prize for which was the adoption of one acre of rainforest. Individual distance winners won T-shirts donated by Mountain Equipment Coop.

=== From intercity challenges to a national challenge ===
In 1997, there was another intercity challenge between Ottawa-Hull and London, Ontario. The winner of the community challenge was London. Participants from Ottawa-Hull and London reduced emissions by an estimated 5 tonnes of carbon dioxide, carbon monoxide and other pollutants.

Other cities would join the challenges soon. That year, organizers from Calgary challenged Vancouver, Ottawa and London to participate in an informal intercity challenge.

In 1998, over 14,500 people in Ottawa-Hull, London, Calgary, Vancouver and Victoria used environment-friendly transportation to get to work during Environment Week.

=== National challenges ===
In 1999, Sustainable Alberta Association (SAA) received Federal Government support through the Climate Change Action Fund to organize a national event over three years. The project, led by Kathryn Winkler, made it possible for regions, workplaces and individuals across Canada to participate and see the impact that they had as a result of their commuter choices. A website displayed results for different regions, workplaces and individuals. Participants could view greenhouse gas (GHG) reductions, calories burned, litres of fuel saved as well as regional and workplace participation levels.

The National Capital Region won the Commuter Challenge in 1999, with 6,248 participants compared to 4,966 participants for Calgary.

By 2000, twenty Canadian cities signed up for the event with host organizations ranging from non-profit environmental groups, municipal offices and health authorities.

The National Capital Region won the Commuter Challenge in 2000, with 10,939 participants compared to 4,500 participants for Calgary. During Environment Week, over 250 tonnes of air pollutants were diverted in the National Capital Region alone.

In 2001, the national program coordination was handed off to an Ottawa-based non-governmental organization, Auto Free Ottawa.

In 2002, it was passed on to Go for Green, another Ottawa-based non-governmental organization. Go for Green coordinated the Commuter Challenge from 2002 to 2008.

In 2003, a total of 48,764 people joined the Commuter Challenge. The event was launched by Environment Minister David Anderson on May 30, 2003. The Commuter Challenge was now a national event, with participation from all provinces and territories. A number of cities showed strong support for green transportation, with high numbers of participants: Ottawa-Gatineau (10,807), Winnipeg (10,058), Vancouver (9,219), Central Okanagan, BC (6,560), Waterloo Region (4,146) and Calgary (1,659).

In 2004, a total of 61,672 people joined the Commuter Challenge, May 30 to June 5, 2004. The winning communities were: National Capital Region (population 1 million or more — 17,472 participants); Winnipeg (500,000 – 999,999 — 12,692 participants); Central Okanagan, BC (100,000 – 499,999 — 7,716 participants); Nanaimo, BC (50,000 – 99,999 — 4,893 participants); and Whitehorse (under 50,000 — 339 participants).

In 2005, a total of 38,168 people participated. Six winning communities attained the highest percentage participation in their population category: National Capital Region (1 million or more); Winnipeg (500,000 – 999,999); Central Okanagan, BC (100,000 – 499,999); Lethbridge, AB (50,000 – 99,999); Whitehorse (10,000 – 49,999); and Whistler, BC (under 10,000).

In 2006, Justin Trudeau was the national spokesperson for the event.

In 2009, SAA took on the national coordination once again. Today the Commuter Challenge is delivered by a small team of dedicated volunteers and occasional contract help out of the SAA office in Calgary, Alberta. The program is primarily funded by fees paid by corporate participants in Calgary and corporate sponsorships. Other financial support includes contributions from regional coordinators, the City of Calgary, foundations and local funding sources.

== Impacts ==
Year	Number of Participating Workplaces	Number of Employees	Number of Participants	CO2 Emissions Prevented	Calories Burned	Kilometres Travelled Sustainably	Fuel Saved http://app.commuterchallenge.ca/commuter/results/
2017	1,674	835,377	17,068	260,809 kg	-	1,621,646	-
2016	1,397	1,029,373	16,554	250,681 kg	-	1,624,580	-
2015	1,601	534,483	20,298	306,477 kg	-	2,018,898	-
2014	1,823	533,832	23,086	388,928 kg	18,881,881	2,556,416	194,975 L
2013	1,790	550,444	24,795	408,651 kg	19,336,197	2,567,648	185,024 L
2012	1,520	540,746	25,571	453,920 kg	21,956,938	2,742,839	190,670 L
2011	1,874	586,163	29,956	553,742 kg	26,119,159	3,301,064	234,691 L
2010	-	-	20,327	530,000 kg	22,197,375	1,708,575	-
2009	1,700	-	41,580	484,719 kg	11,572,008	3,168,922	115,811 L
2008	-	-	20,493	-	-	-	-
2007	1,757	-	42,000	-	-	-	-
2006	-	-	38,549	-	-	3,589,636	-
2005	-	-	38,168	729,986 kg	-	3,345,916	-
2004	-	-	61,672	614,843 kg	-	2,834,729	-
2003	1,260	-	48,764	746,863 kg	-	3,711,272	-
2002	-	-	46,437	-	-	-	-
2001	-	-	38,200	-	-	-	-
2000	-	-	-	-	-	-	-
1999	-	-	-	-	-	-	-

== Partner organizations ==
Commuter Challenge has had many partners over the years. Significant long-term partners include: Better Environmentally Sound Transportation (BEST), a non-profit organization that coordinates the Commuter Challenge in British Columbia; the Green Action Centre, an organization that coordinates the event in Manitoba; and Clean Nova Scotia, a foundation based in Nova Scotia.

Government partners have included the Province of Manitoba, the Province of British Columbia, the City of Winnipeg, the City of Regina and the Region of Waterloo. Major support is received annually though collaboration with the City of Calgary, notably its transportation department.

Sustainable Alberta Association and the Calgary Commuter Challenge received funding from the Climate Change Action Fund (CCAF). The funding supported development of an online data collection system.

In 2011 Sustainable Alberta Association participated in the Shell "Fuelling Change" grant and won $100,000 to help facilitate the development of the new commuter tracking software. In 2012 Commuter Challenge partnered with Climate Change Central (C-3), another Alberta-based environmental advocacy group, to give away air miles to randomly chosen participants. ConocoPhillips has been the longest standing private sector supporter of the Calgary Commuter Challenge (since 2007) that contributes directly to the national program.
