= Driftpile, Alberta =

Coordinates: 55°20′53″N 115°48′14″W

Location of Driftpile, Alberta

Driftpile is a community on the Drift Pile River 150 Indian reserve, in northern Alberta, Canada. It is located on Highway 2, approximately 191 kilometres (119 mi) east of Grande Prairie.

The locality takes its name from the Driftpile River.
