= PeaceFest =

PeaceFest is an annual music festival held in Peace River, Alberta. The festival was started in 1997 following a flood that destroyed much of downtown Peace River, and regularly draws crowds of over 10,000 people.
