= Canmore Folk Festival =

Annual music event in Alberta, Canada

- Genre: Folk music
- Locations: Canmore, Alberta, Canada; 51.520°N 113.472°W
- Years active: 1978-2019, 2021 – present
- Founders: Michael & Judy Vincent
- Website: canmorefolkfestival.com

The Canmore Folk Festival is an annual three-day outdoor music event held the first weekend of August in Canmore, Alberta, Canada, established in 1978. Though the town of Canmore has a population of less than 14,000, the festival averages an attendance rate of over 19,000 each year. As of 2018, the producer of the festival is Sue Panning and the festival is managed by Ken Pillipow. The festival relies on over 600 volunteers and is a community affair.

== History ==
The festival showcases performers in many genres. Most years, folk, Celtic, bluegrass, blues, gospel, roots, and worldbeat acts perform. Past main stage performers include Bruce Cockburn, Buffy Sainte-Marie, Ian Tyson, Cowboy Junkies, Grievous Angels, Blue Rodeo, Bedouin Soundclash, and William Prince. In addition to mainstage concerts by individual artists, the festival has artists collaborate on shared session stages. The Canmore Folk Music Festival is held at Centennial Park, in downtown Canmore. Alberta's Rockies act as a backdrop for the festival stages.

There was no festival in 2020.

== See also ==
- List of festivals in Alberta
- List of music festivals in Canada
- Category:Music festivals in Canada
