= Purple City Music Festival =

Multi-day music festival and showcase

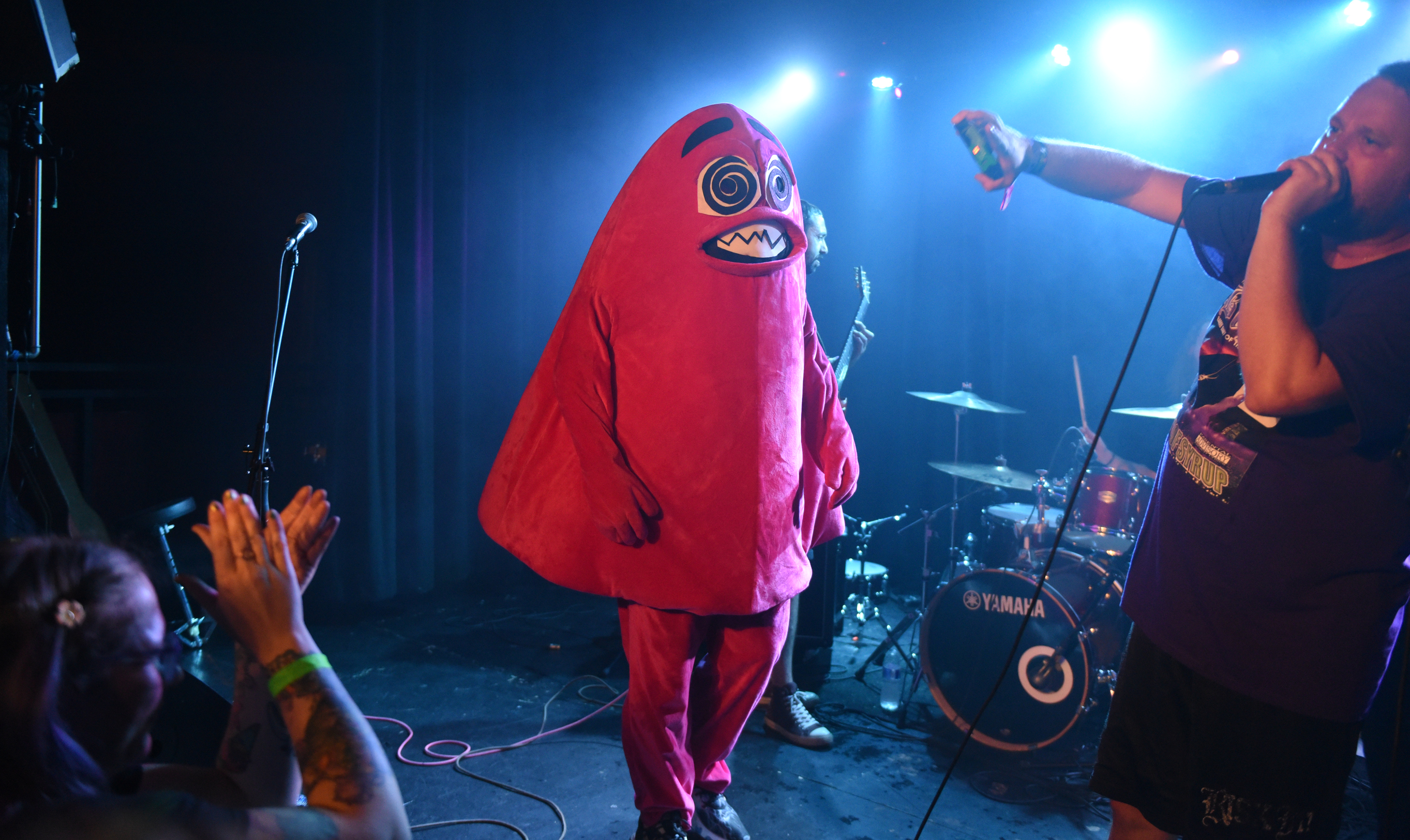
- Purple City mascot Nurple joins the hardcore band Vibes on stage at Temple, 25 August 2023.
- Genre: Rock, Alternative rock, Indie rock, Punk rock, Psychedelic rock, Post-punk, Shoegaze
- Dates: Fall
- Locations: Edmonton, Canada
- Years active: 2012 - present
- Website: Purple City Music Festival

Purple City Music Festival is a multi-day music festival and showcase for all ages, held in various live music venues and other locations in downtown Edmonton, the capital city of the Canadian province of Alberta.

== Festival History ==
The festival started out -- or grew out of -- the Up + Downtown Music Festival, which ran annually from 2013 to 2019. In 2020, Ryan Rathjen, a radio host on CJSR-FM, became executive director of the festival, and led its rebranding in an attempt to make the festival more inclusive and collaborative.

Purple City 2021 was held outdoors in William Hawrelak Park.

The following year, amid the easing of pandemic restrictions, the festival was held in various locations across the city, including Hawrelak Park and the Garneau Theatre.

Its 2023 edition was held 25-27 August, featuring over 60 acts at eight stages within a two-block radius. The venues included The Starlite Room, the Freemasons Hall of Edmonton, McDougall United Church, and Downtown Edmonton Community League, as well as the Purple City Block Party, an outdoor stage on 102 Street NW which was closed to car traffic for the day.

The headliners included Los Angeles hardcore punk supergroup Off! fronted by Keith Morris of Black Flag/Circle Jerks fame, LA garage rock band Death Valley Girls, Hand Habits, Frankie and the Witch Fingers, Light Asylum, and Austin shoegaze band Ringo Deathstarr.

A highlight of the festival was BatScratch, fronted by a 7-year-old boy. Their presence on the lineup reportedly helped convince Off! to join the festival.

The festival has been praised for taking place in one central area, as well as for allowing underage people to enter all the venues, plus the inclusion of a high number of female-fronted acts.

== Meaning of Name ==
The name Purple City comes from a ritualistic tradition of the local youth culture. People visit the Alberta Legislature Building at night to stare into the floodlights. After about a minute of exposure, the light makes all the surroundings appear purple.
