= Calgary International Reggae Festival =

Annual event in Calgary, Alberta, Canada

Coordinates: 51°02′46″N 114°05′30″W

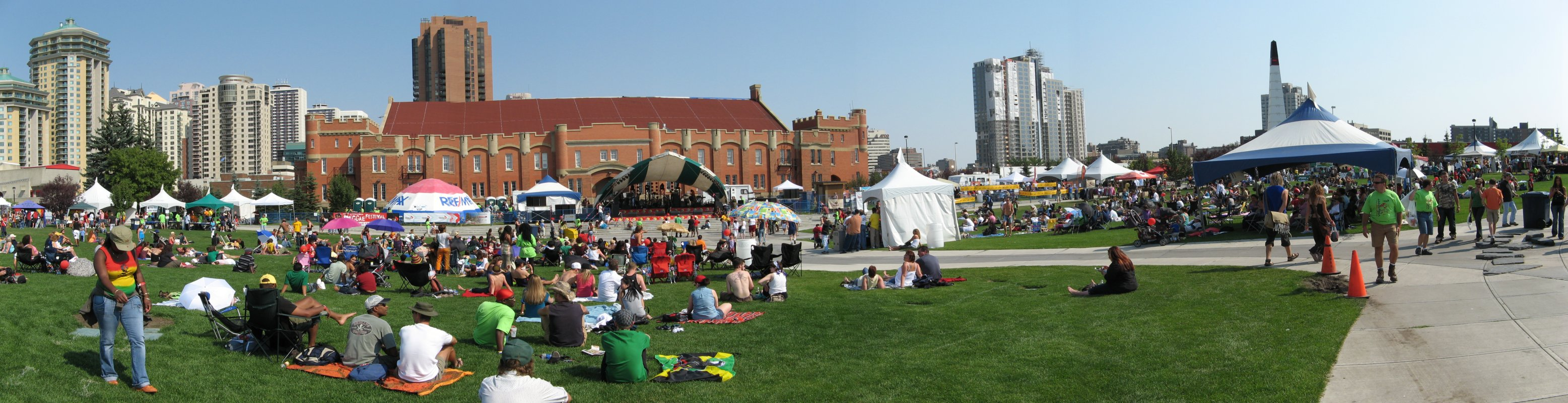
- Calgary International Reggae Fest 2006
- Genre: Music festival
- Dates: Mid August
- Locations: Millennium Park, Calgary
- Years active: 2004–2019, 2021–
- Patron: Calgary Reggae Festival Society
- Website: www.reggaefest.ca

The Calgary International Reggae Festival is an annual event in Calgary, Alberta, Canada, that is organized by the Calgary Reggae Festival Society.

Featuring a mixture of local and international reggae acts, the festival has taken place every year since 2004. Starting as a one-day event, by 2008 it had expanded to a ten-day festival. The festival was co-founded by Leo Cripps, the host of CJSW-FM's Caribbean Link-Up show, and from an early stage it was sponsored by radio station Vibe 98.5.

The 2014 event was headlined by Third World.

== Festivals ==
Year	Artists	Date	Location	Notes
2014	Infiniti, Mountain Edge Roots & Culture Band, Raging Fyah, Uno Band, Belinda Brady, Buckman Coe, Da'Ville, Exco Levi, Long Shen Dao, L.U.S.T, Mountain Edge Roots & Culture Band, Tasman Jude, Third World	August 13–16	Shaw Millennium Park	
2013	Leroy Sibbles, Yaz Alexander, Ammoye, House of David Gang, Jason Wilson Band, J.k & the Relays, Lukie D, Ky-mani Marley, Mello Man, Power House, Tony Rebel, Sadiki, Elaine Shepherd, The Steadies, Steele, Dave Swarbick, Ultimate Crew		Shaw Millennium Park	
2012	Cherine Anderson, Bryan Art, Monster Shock Crew Hawkeye, Makeshift Innocence, Roots Syndicate, J.K. & the Relays, Third Branch, Souljah Fyah, Redeye Empire, Rocky Mountain Rebel Music, Ultimate Crew, the Dennis Brown review with Chester Miller, Jermaine Cowan, Friendlyness and the Human Rights, New Kingston		Shaw Millennium Park	
2011	Chino, Dhalia, Fenom, Freddie McGregor, Ibadan, Kae Sun, Laden, Lenn Hammond, Nadine Sutherland, Natural Flavas, New Kingston, Rebel Emergency, Singin' D, Souljah Fyah, Stephen 'di Genius' McGregor, The Soulicitors, Tinga Stewart, Tonya P		Shaw Millennium Park	
2010	Beres Hammond, Inner Circle, Culture, Bianca, Elaine 'Lil'Bit' Shepherd, Explosion Band, Fenom, Lenya Wilks, Mandy Woods, Mello G, Nadera, Nesbeth, Progress, Strugglah, Tony Anthony	August 19–21	Shaw Millennium Park	
2009	Culture featuring Kenyatta Hill, Beres Hammond, Culture Brown, DJ Butta and Superheavy Reggae, Friendlyness and the Human Rights, Greg Crowe & The Scarlet Union, Jon Bone with the Karuna Movement, Korexion, Lenya Wilks, Mello Man, Rastrillos, Roger Steffens, Shabuungo Ouda Ouda, Tasha T, The Idlers, The Soulicitors	August 13–15	Shaw Millennium Park	
2008	Steele, Souljah Fyah, Brinsley Forde, Jason Wilson and Tabarruk, Aktivate, JFK and the Conspirators, Michael St. George, Bianca, Tinga Stewart, Sugar Minott, Culture Brown, LJX, Mikey Dangerous, Oral Fuentes Reggae Band, Michael Thompson aka the Visionary, Spirit of World Drumming, La Comuna, Lynn Olagundoye and Guerrilla Funk Monster, Queen Ifrica, Tony Rebel		Shaw Millennium Park	
2007	Abijah, Andru Branch and Halfway Tree, Causion, Dub Station featuring Tom O'Brien, Errol Blackwood, Eyesus, Hardcore Ras Bagga, Humble, IBO and KinDread, Kirk Davis, Mz. Mosea, Richie Stephens, Set Speed Crew, Tanya Mullings	August 18	Shaw Millennium Park	
2006	Sugar Minott, Mutabaruka, Ras Gandhi, George Nooks, Truths and Rights, Odel, Toni Anderson, Devon Irie, Fredlocks Asher and the Ultra Flex Crew, JFK and the Conspirators, Strugglah, and Bianca.	August 19	Shaw Millennium Park	
2005	Featuring Brinsley Forde of Aswad, Tinga Stewart, 2 time JUNO Award Winner Sonia Collymore, Michael St. George, Jason Wilson & Tabarruk, Ryan, Aktivate, Roger Steffens, Souljah Fyah, Joshua, Ibo & KinDread, Jahranimo, Lenky, Sampaloo, Shadrock, Shellane, Obi Nwosuagwu and the Ultimate Crew.	August 20	Shaw Millennium Park	
2004	Belinda, Blessed, Donna Makeda, King Ujah, Wayne Wonder	August 14	Burns Stadium	

== See also ==
- List of reggae festivals
- List of festivals in Canada
- Music of Canada
