= David Hardie =

David Hardie may refer to:

- David Hardie (physician) (1856–1945), Australian medical practitioner
- David Hardie (politician) (1870s–1939), British politician
- David Hardie (architect) (1882–1959), Canadian architect

== See also ==
- David Hardy (disambiguation)
