= K-Days =

Annual exhibition held in Edmonton, Canada

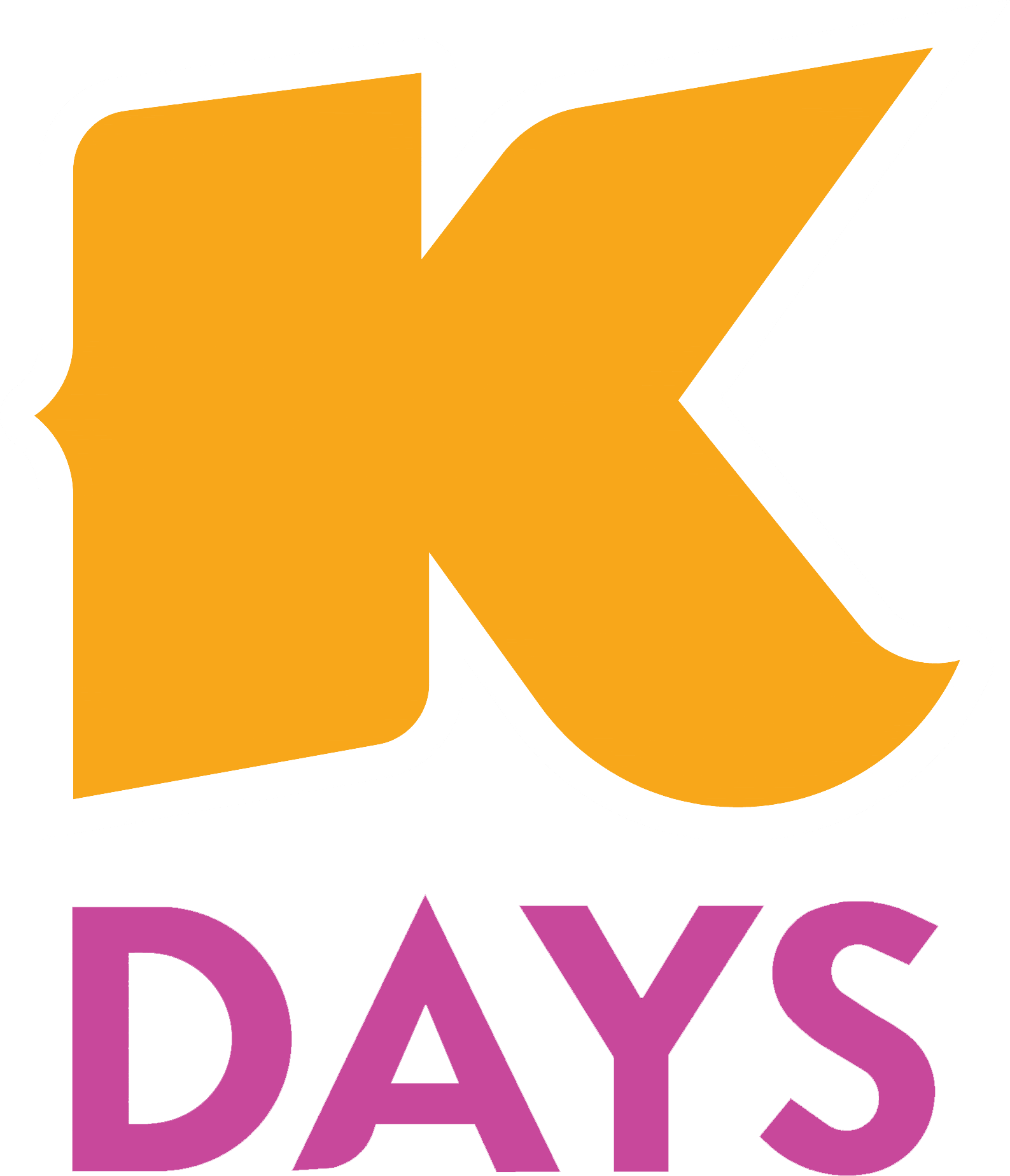
- Former logo, used from 2012-2022. A new logo was introduced for 2023.

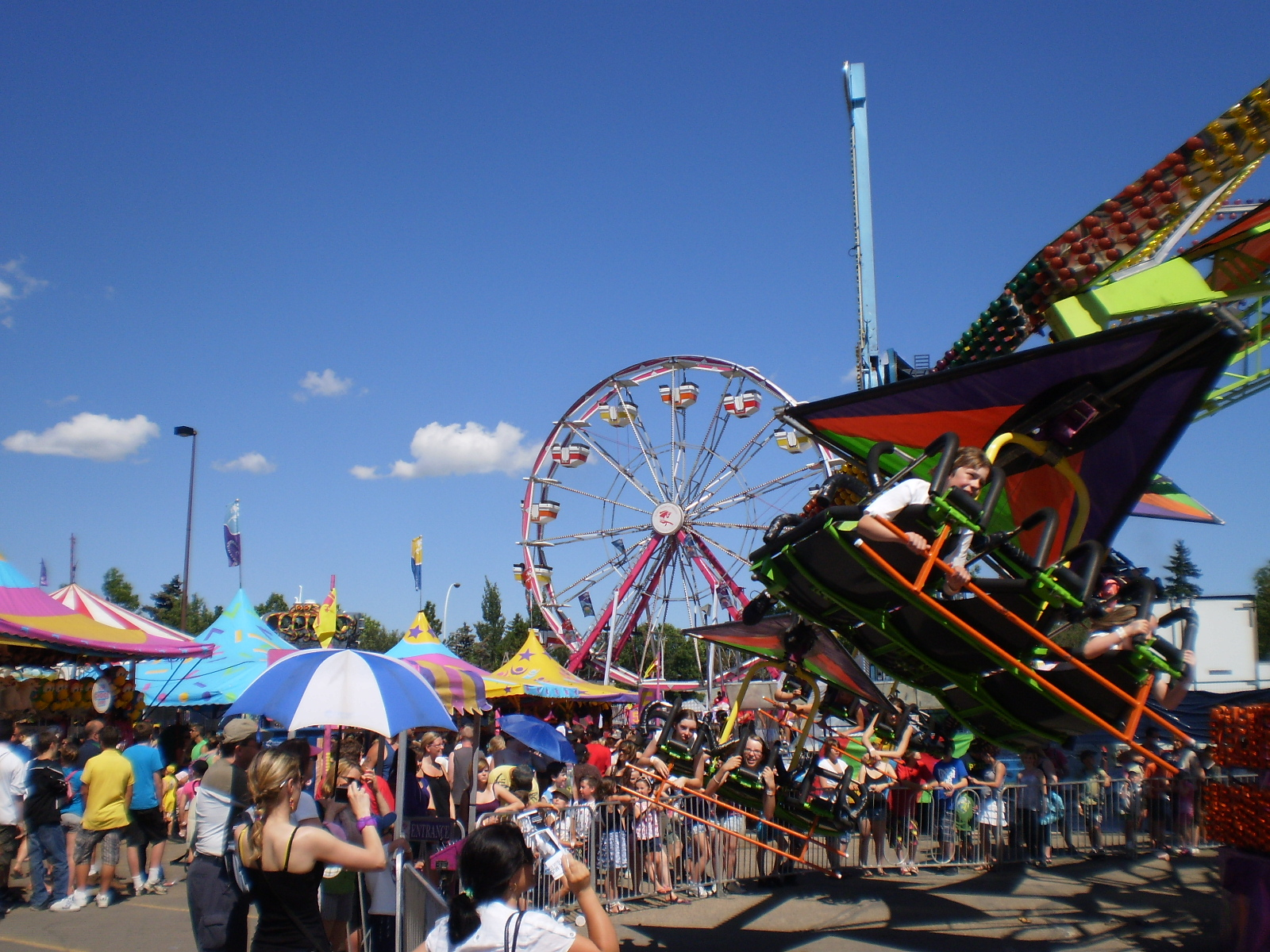
- 2010 fairgrounds
- Genre: Summer fair
- Dates: 10 days, starting the third Friday of July (fourth Friday if the first Friday is Canada Day or the day after Canada Day)) ending last Sunday of July or first Sunday of August
- Locations: Edmonton Expo Centre, Edmonton, Alberta; 53°34′7″N 113°27′29″W
- Years active: 147
- Founded: 15 October 1879
- Patrons: 764,140 (2025); 816,250 (2017; record)
- Website: k-days.com

K-Days, formerly known as the Edmonton Exhibition, Klondike Days, and Capital Ex, is an annual 10-day exhibition held in Edmonton, Alberta, Canada mostly in late July. It runs in conjunction with the Taste of Edmonton, the Great Outdoors Comedy Festival, and – from 2006 through 2012 – the Edmonton Indy.

The exhibition, hosted by Explore Edmonton beginning 2022, and hosted until 2019 by Northlands, is held at the Exhibition Lands also known as the Edmonton Northlands Grounds adjoining Edmonton Expo Centre. K-Days begins on the third Friday of July and five days after the Calgary Stampede (until 2009, it began four days after), making it end on the Sunday of July's last weekend.

== Name ==
The fair was originally named the Edmonton Exhibition from its founding in 1879 until 1964 when it was renamed Klondike Days. The name change coincided with the introduction of the kitsch theme associated with the 1890s and the Klondike Gold Rush. The gold rush had taken place over a thousand miles to the northwest. Edmonton was a stopping point for prospectors headed to the Yukon Territory on the "all-Canadian overland route".

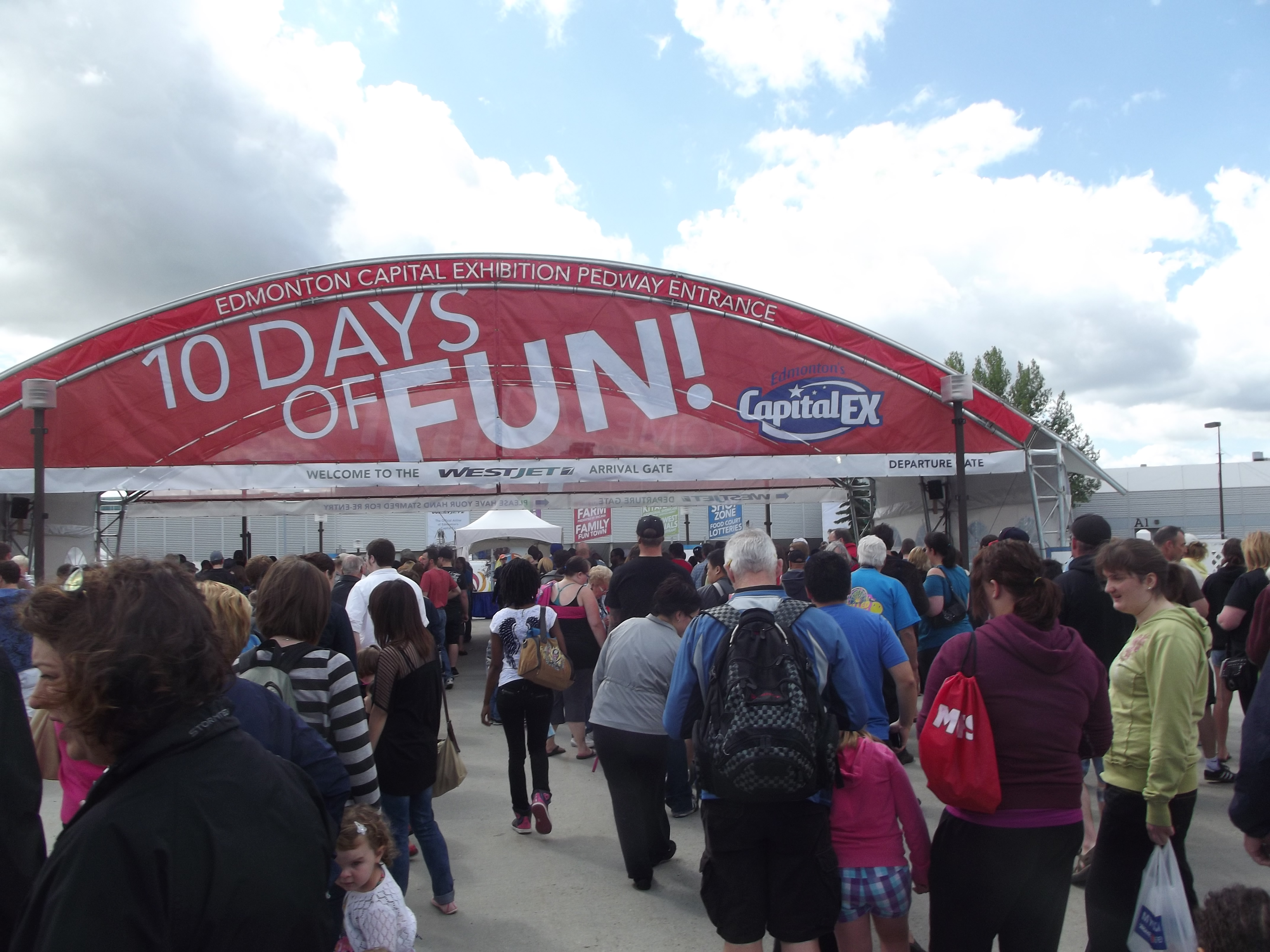
A banner that reads Capital Ex atop the fair's entrance. The fair was named Capital Ex from 2006 to 2012.

The name was changed to Capital Ex, in 2006. There was some controversy over the change in name from Klondike Days, with many locals continuing to refer to the exhibition as Klondike Days or K-Days. Ken Knowles, President of Northlands, explained that the rebranding "... was so much more than a name. It was about the programming and the opportunity to showcase the best of the region and the province". The name change was recognized at the 2007 Alberta Tourism Awards, where Knowles stated "This recognition from the tourism industry is particularly gratifying as it reinforces our ongoing efforts through Capital Ex to continue to celebrate our province and to build Alberta pride."

Before the 2012 event, Northlands announced that the Capital Ex name would be retired, and a new name would be chosen by public vote. Eventgoers chose K-Days from the six names offered. The new name for the fair was announced on July 29, 2012. The original Klondike Days name was not one of the six options available. Some fans of the event's previous name, Klondike Days, have stated that the name change to Capital Ex was a poor decision due to the region's history. Many feel that the event being renamed back to K-Days, by the overwhelming majority of the vote, shows just how much of a mistake the initial name change was.

== History ==
The Edmonton Agricultural Society organized the first local exhibition on the original Fort Edmonton site on October 15, 1879. This was the first event of its kind held in what was then known as the North-West Territories. Edmonton's first fair showcased locally produced livestock, grain, vegetables, and handiwork and attracted 500 people. Calgary and Saskatoon soon started their own exhibitions in 1886 with Regina following in 1894. In 1893, the organization held the city's first spring exhibition, and in 1899, the exhibition grounds were relocated to Rossdale Flats (now Edmonton Ballpark). By 1904, the exhibition's attendance exceeded 20,000 (5,200 on opening day). During this period Arthur G. Harrison was President of the Edmonton Exhibition Association.

The first parade to promote the fair was held in 1903. However, the fair did not organize a community parade in the 1930s and 1940s.

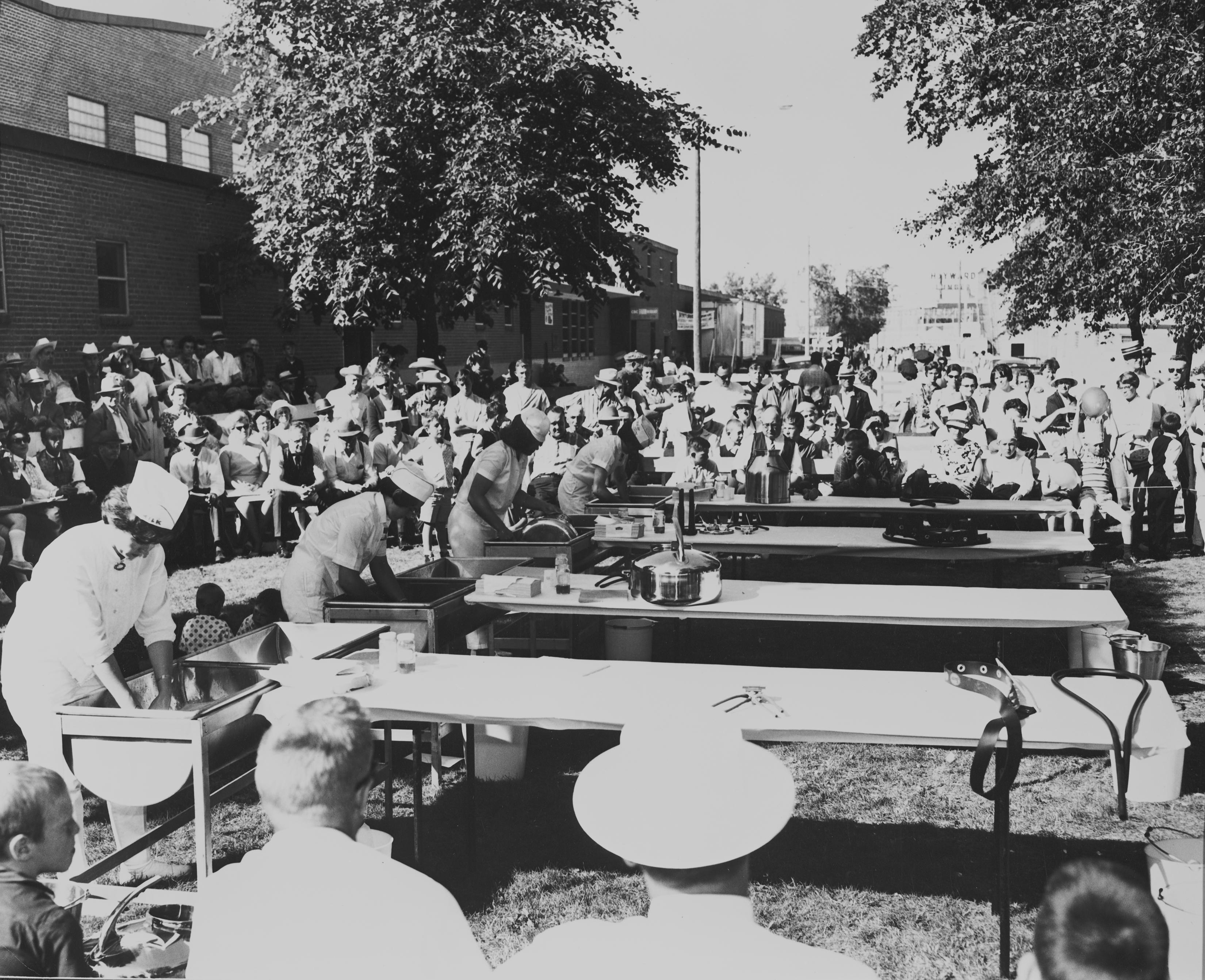
The Dairy Princess competition at the fair, c. 1960.

The fair was relocated to its current site in Northlands (now named Edmonton Expo Centre) in 1910. In 1912, it was extended to six days. It continued to be held through the First World War, even though the facilities were at the disposal of the Canadian military. A similar arrangement was made during the Second World War, though this time with the Royal Canadian Air Force.

The exhibition was renamed "Klondike Days" in 1962, with the theme revolving around the Klondike Gold Rush. The public embraced the theme with relish, dressing up in period costumes for the Klondike Days opening parade.

In the 1980s, films were screened on-site at the exhibition's RCMP Dome Theatre; for example, Roger Tilton's film Pilots North was screened in 1982.

In the 1990s, the Grand North American Old Time Fiddle Championship shifted to be in conjunction with Klondike Days, helping the event recover from the recession.

In 2004, Northlands Park celebrated the 125th anniversary of the fair. The Klondike Days Parade's theme commemorated the City of Edmonton's 100th anniversary that year. Fair attendance continued to climb, breaking the 800,000 attendance mark in 2005. However, in 2006, attendance fell to 688,369, coinciding with the year that the name of the exhibition was changed to "Capital EX". The change was met with both protest and excitement from citizens. Some felt a name change was unnecessary, while others felt it was time to drop "traditional themes" citing that there was no longer an interest in dressing up in Klondike-themed clothing during the week-long exhibition.

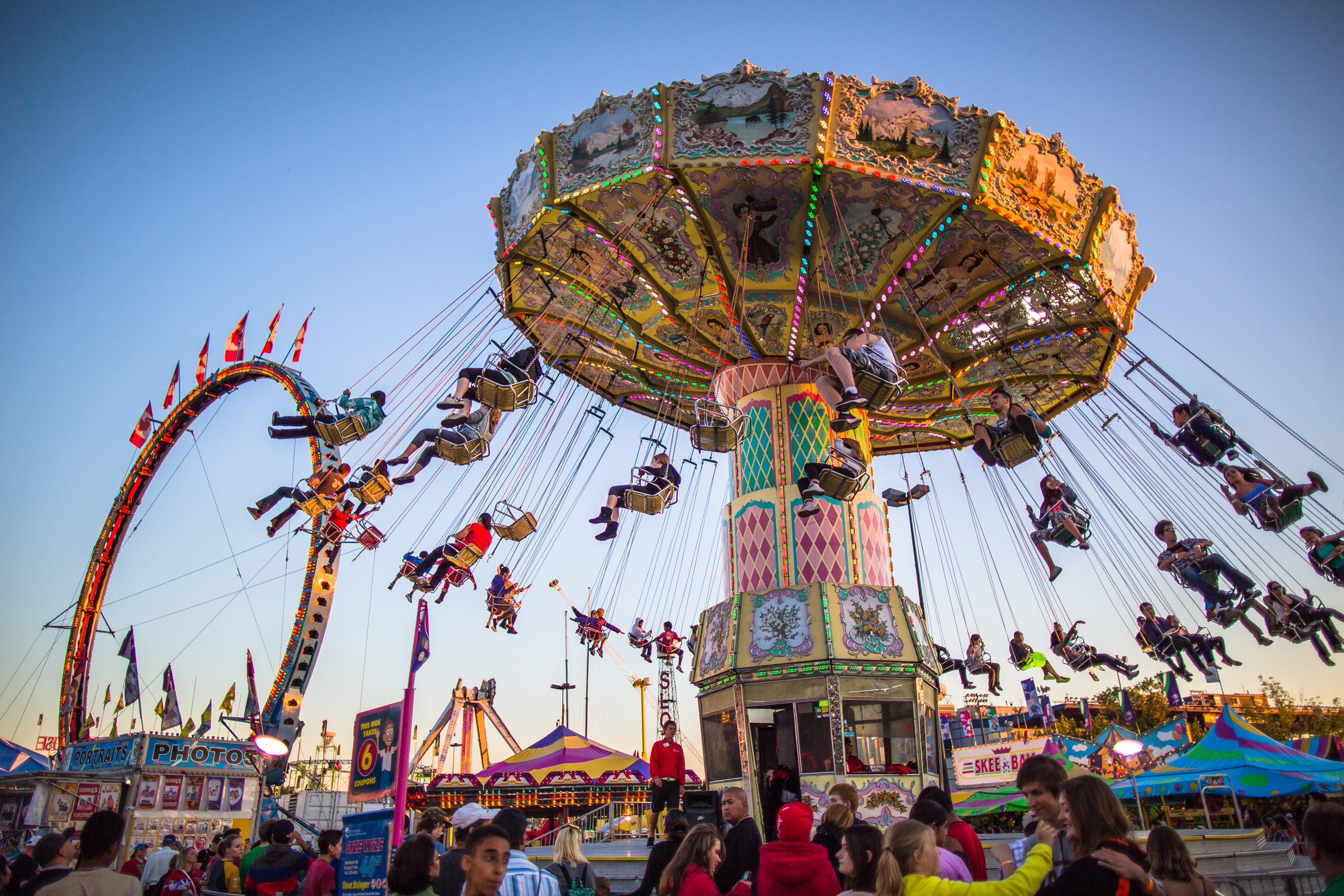
The chair swing ride at K-Days in 2014.

Northlands decided not to release the 2008 attendance numbers due to an agreement with the Indy Racing League. However, Northlands changed its decision and released the attendance figures showing 743,374 attendees, a drop of almost 30,000 from the previous year. In 2009 the attendance dropped again, by more than 25,000, to a total of 717,966, but rebounded again by 4% in 2010 to 747,660. In 2011 the attendance had risen to 713,546 and the following year the fair had attracted 747,660 visitors.

In 2014, 740,840 people attended K-Days and sales totalled over $100 million.

In 2015, 785,290 attended, the highest in the past 10 years.

In 2017, despite the weather, 816,000 people attended K-Days.

In 2018, even though the fair began with anti-abortion and animal rights protests, K-Days managed to attract 808,009 people.

In February 2020, the United Conservative Party government announced cuts to provincial funding for both K-Days and the Calgary Stampede as part of the 2020 budget. On February 28, Northlands announced that the K-Days parade would not take place, citing "current fiscal realities", declines in attendance, and a desire to invest in more "on-site" programming.

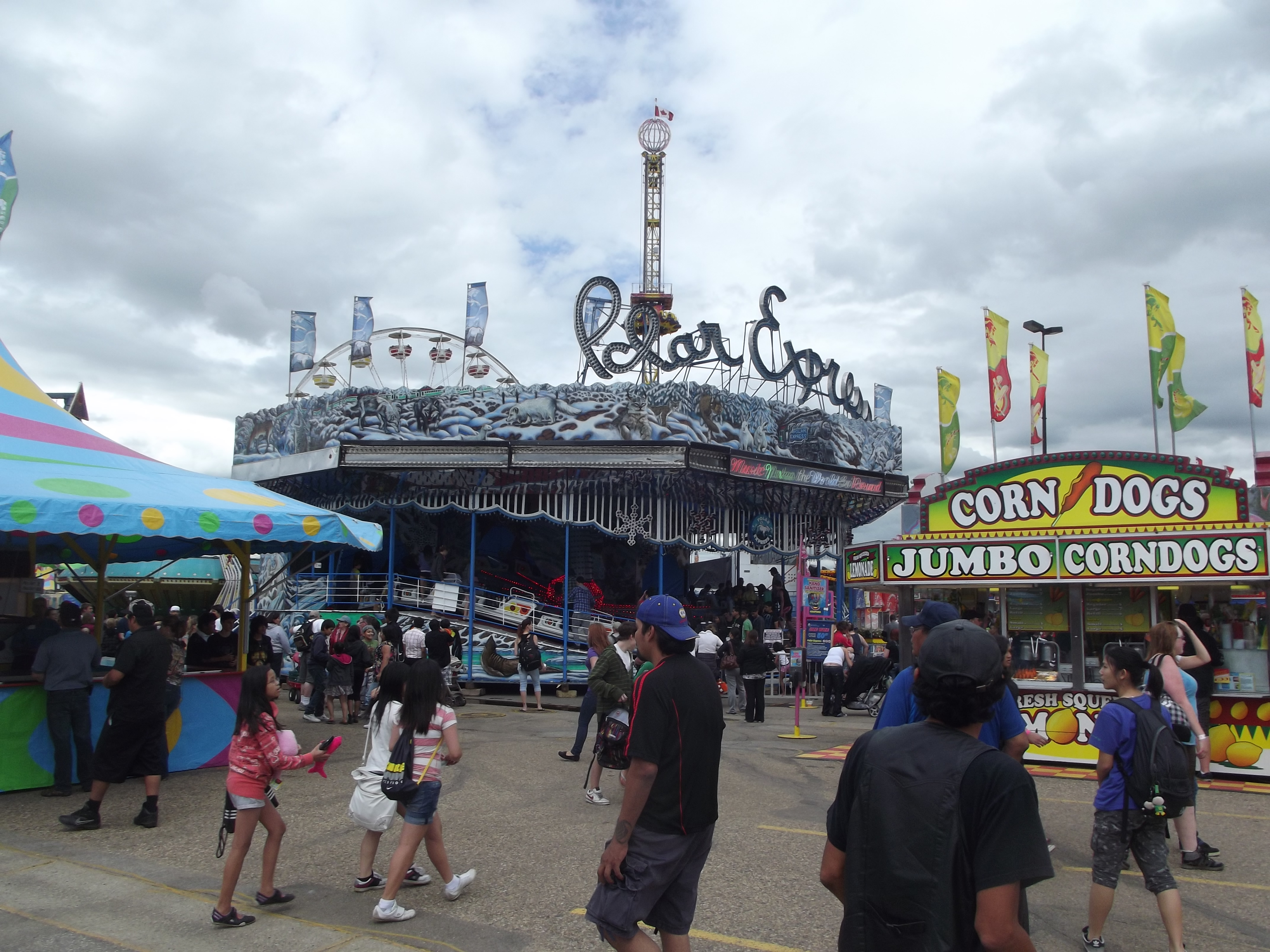
The fair's midway in 2011.

In April 2020, K-Days cancelled that summer's event due to the COVID-19 pandemic in Alberta. In May 2021, despite a planned easing of restrictions in Alberta by July, and the Stampede announcing plans to move ahead with their event, K-Days was cancelled for the second year in a row due to the pandemic "following discussions with the City of Edmonton and Explore Edmonton". The organization cited limited time and resources, and a desire to focus on 2022 as to not hold K-Days in 2021 only for the sake of holding it. Northlands stated that it was also acting out of respect to other Edmonton events that did announce plans to return in a modified form for 2021. On June 10, 2021, Northlands announced its dissolution, and that Explore Edmonton would assume operations of K-Days and Farmfair International.

== Dream home lottery ==
From 1955 until 2010, K-Days hosted a prize home lottery. Prior to 1964, Klondike Days was named the Edmonton Exhibition; therefore for the first nine years of the contest, from 1955 until 1963, the lottery was named the Edmonton Exhibition Dream Home Lottery. Similarly, for the final three years of the lottery, the event was named the Capital Ex Dream Home Lottery. Each year, the home was assembled and displayed at the Northlands exhibition grounds for the duration of the Klondike Days exhibition. Once a winner was determined, each home would then be transported to an empty lot in Edmonton or a suburb of Edmonton such as St. Albert or Sherwood Park. Since the lottery's inception in 1955, the Klondike Days dream home lottery has been sponsored by the Edmonton Lions Club. Historically, local Edmonton businesses provided labour and building materials for these dream homes in exchange for advertising that certified their involvement; for example, Rainbow Eavestroughing was advertised in the Edmonton Journal after manufacturing and installing eavestroughs on the 1965 Dream Home. In 1961, the Edmonton Journal reported that "some 25 Edmonton businesses contributed to the construction of the home." The first Klondike Days Dream Home lottery took place in 1955, and was labelled the "Golden Dream Home" in conjunction with Alberta's golden jubilee of that year.

== Arms ==
Coat of arms of K-Days
Notes Recorded at the College of Arms 1 March 1963. Crest Two quills in saltire Or in front of a lyre Gules. Escutcheon Vert a saltire Or surmounted by a rose Gules seeded Proper between in chief an open book Proper edged Or and in base a cogwheel Argent charged with a goutte d’huile in each flank a garb Or. Motto Pro bono publico (Latin for 'for the public good') Badge A torch Or enflamed Proper surmounted by a horse courant Or.

== See also ==
- List of festivals in Canada
- List of festivals in Alberta
- List of festivals in Edmonton
