= David Hardy =

David Hardy may refer to:

- David T. Hardy (born 1951), American author and attorney
- David A. Hardy (born 1936), British artist and illustrator
- David Hardy (American football) (born 1959), American football player
- David Hardy (businessman) (1930–2020), British businessman
- David Hardy (cricketer) (1877–1951), English cricketer

== See also ==
- David Hardie (physician) (1856–1945), doctor
- David Hardie (politician) (1860s–1939), British politician
