= Montrose, Edmonton =

Montrose
- Neighbourhood
- Location of Montrose in Edmonton
- Coordinates: 53.574°N 113.442°W
- Country: Canada
- Province: Alberta
- City: Edmonton
- Quadrant: NW
- Ward: Métis
- Sector: Mature area

Government
  - Administrative body: Edmonton City Council
  - Councillor: Ashley Salvador

Area
  - Total: 1.41 km^{2} (0.54 sq mi)
- Elevation: 662 m (2,172 ft)

Population (2012)
  - Total: 3,249
  - Density: 2,304.3/km^{2} (5,968/sq mi)
  - Change (2009–12): ▲3%
  - Dwellings: 1,586

Montrose is a residential neighbourhood in north east Edmonton, Alberta, Canada.

It is bounded on the north by the Yellowhead Trail, on the west by the Canadian National Railway right of way and the north east line of the Edmonton Transit Service's LRT system, on the south by 118 (Alberta) Avenue, and on the east by 58 Street. Wayne Gretzky Drive, which provides access to destinations south of the North Saskatchewan River, passes through the neighbourhood. The Coliseum LRT Station is located at the north west corner of the neighbourhood. Notable landmarks in the neighbourhood include Northlands Park and the Edmonton Expo Centre.

The community is represented by the Montrose Community League, established in 1951, which maintains a community hall and outdoor rink located at 59 Street and 119 Avenue.

== Demographics ==
In the City of Edmonton's 2012 municipal census, Montrose had a population of 3,249 living in 1,586 dwellings, a 3% change from its 2009 population of 3,153. With a land area of 1.41 km^{2} (0.54 sq mi), it had a population density of 2,304.3 people/km^{2} in 2012.

== Residential development ==
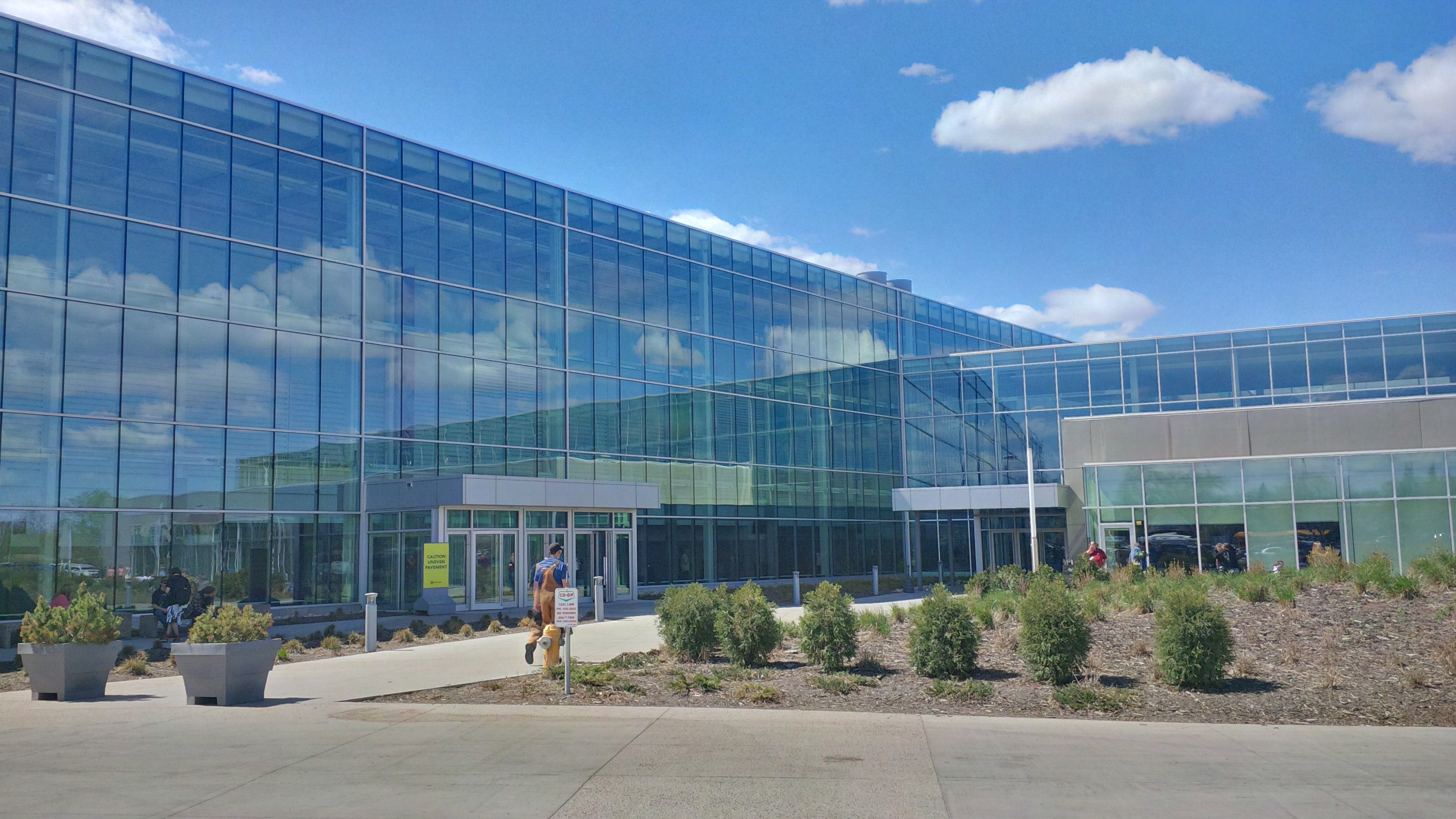
Edmonton Expo Centre

Development of the neighbourhood began before the end of World War II with approximately one in five (20.4%) of residences being constructed before 1946 according to the 2001 federal census. Just under half of the residences (45.6%) were constructed between 1946 and 1960. Most of the remaining residences were built by 1980.

The most common type of residence in the neighbourhood, according to the 2005 municipal census, is the single-family dwelling. These account for roughly four out of five (78%) of all the residences. Most of the remainder (16%) are rented apartments in low-rise buildings with fewer than five stories. The remaining 6% are duplexes. Three out of five (61%) are owner-occupied with the remaining two out of five (39%) being rented.

According to the 2005 municipal census, the neighbourhood population is highly mobile with one in six (17.1%) having moved within the previous year. Another one in five (19.5%) had moved within the previous one to three years. Less than half of all residents (47.8%) had lived at the same address for five or more years.

== Schools and recreation ==
There are two schools in the neighbourhood.

Montrose Elementary School (now closed) was operated by the Edmonton Public School System while Ben Calf Robe St Clare Elementary Junior High School is operated by the Edmonton Catholic School System.

The Russ Barnes Arena is also located in the neighbourhood.

== See also ==
- Edmonton Federation of Community Leagues
