= Tyrone Heritage Residences =

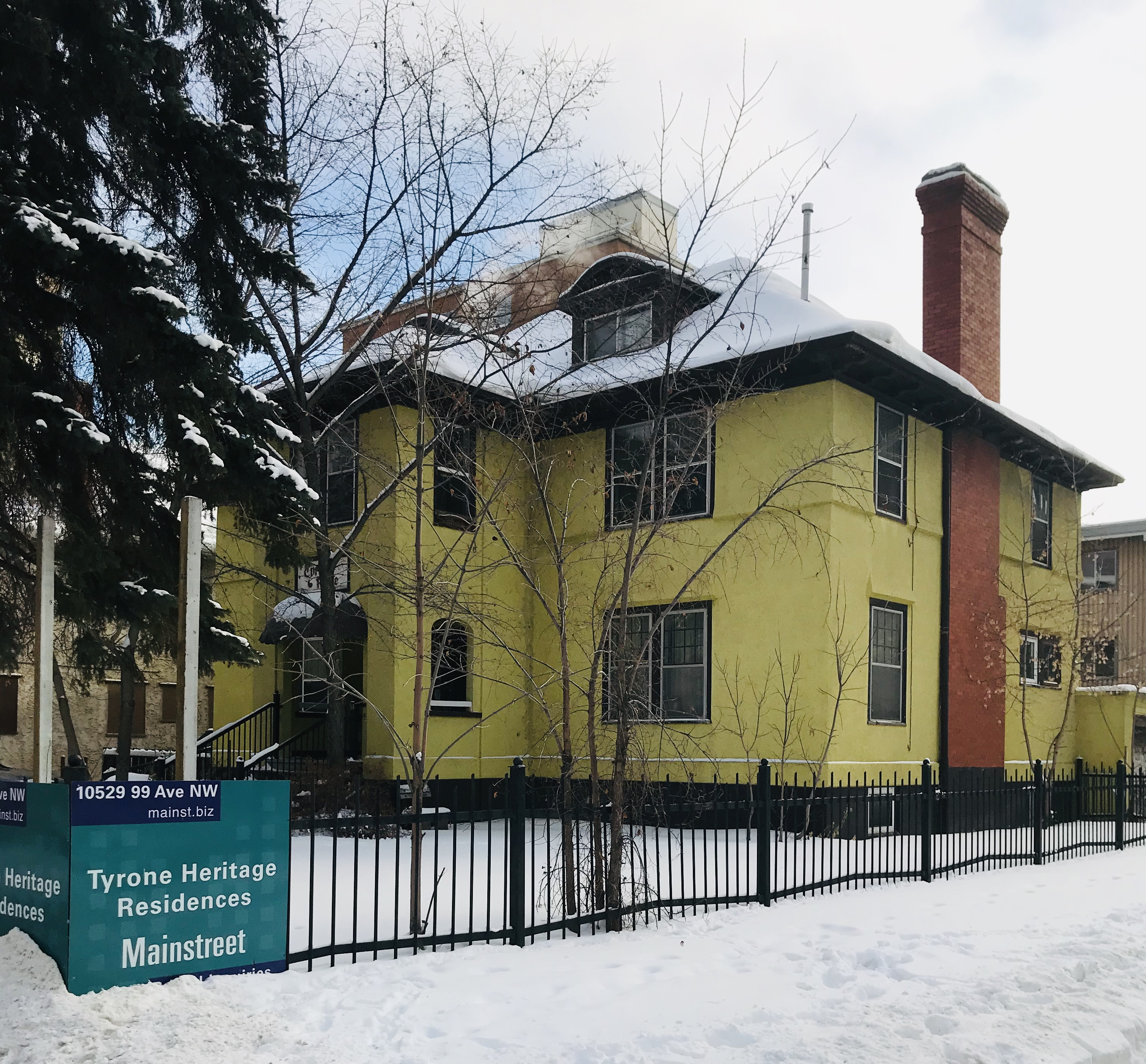
- Tyrone Heritage Residences in 2023
- Interactive map of the Tyrone Heritage Residences area
- Former names: Tyrone Place, Tyrone Manor, Tyrone Apartments

General information
- Location: 10529 99 Ave NW Edmonton, AB T5K 0E7
- Coordinates: 53°32′13.1″N 113°30′9.1″W

Design and construction
- Architect: David Hardie

Website
- www.mainst.biz/apartments/edmonton/tyrone-heritage-residences

Tyrone Heritage Residences (historically known as Tyrone Apartments, Tyrone Manor and Tyrone Place) is a heritage building in Edmonton, Canada, best known as the former home of Alberta's third Premier, Charles Stewart.

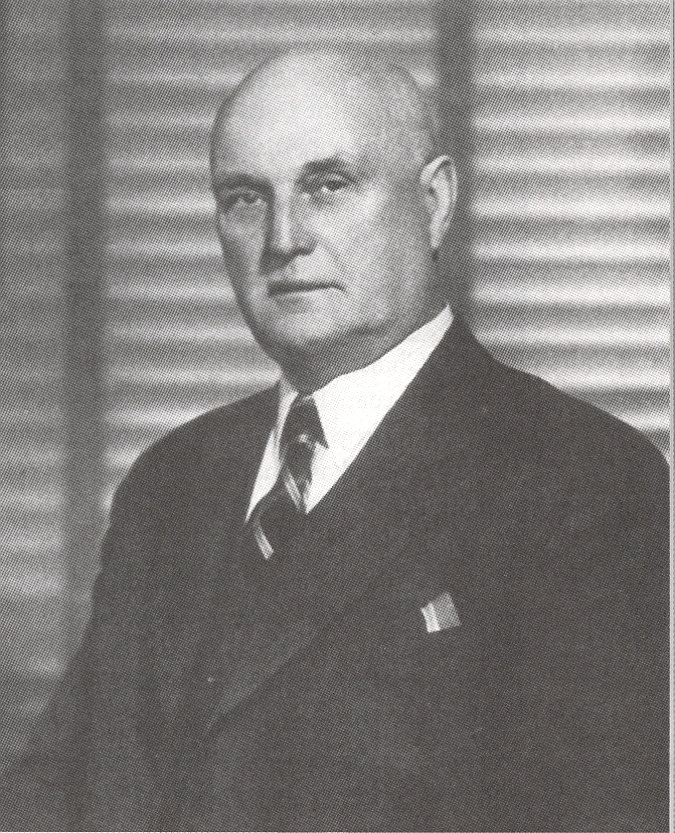
Tyrone Place was the residence of Charles Stewart in the 1920s

== History ==
Tyrone Place was built in 1912. Although the house was not built until 1912, City of Edmonton Commissioner Arthur G. Harrison resided on that piece of land from 1903 until 1919. Alberta's third Premier Charles Stewart purchased the home in 1920. The home gradually started to be converted into suites beginning in 1927. The building was renamed Tyrone Apartments in 1934.

== Architecture ==
Tyrone Place is three storeys in height and features oak hardwood floors throughout the building. Tyrone Place was designed by Canadian architect David Hardie, who is known for having designed a number of other significant buildings in Edmonton such as Sacred Heart Church of the First Peoples, Hilltop House, the Hecla Block and the Armstrong Block. The Alberta Register of Historic Places has stated that "prior to the Hecla Apartments, Hardie had designed the J.C. McDougall Residence (1912) on 103 Street, the Tyrone Apartments on 99 Avenue and The Armstrong Block (1912) on 104 Street."

== Notable residents ==
=== Homeowners ===
Beyond its architectural significance, a number of notable individuals resided at Tyrone Place. During the first two decades of its existence the home was owned variously by three notable politicians, namely Arthur G. Harrison, Charles Stewart, and Perren Baker.

==== Arthur G. Harrison ====
Former residents of Tyrone Place have included Alberta's third Premier Charles Stewart, Edmonton City Commissioner Arthur G. Harrison.

==== Charles Stewart ====
Charles Stewart was politician who served as the third premier of Alberta from 1917 until 1921.

==== Perren Baker ====
Perren Baker lived at Tyrone Place from 1923 until 1927. During this time he served as Alberta's Minister of Education, a position he held until 1935.

=== Subsequent tenants ===
World War II Private William Moore resided at Tyrone Place.

Dr. George Edwin Long resided at Tyrone Place throughout the 1930s and early 1940s. The Edmonton Bulletin described George Edwin Long as "one of the longest practicing dentists in Edmonton who arrived in 1910 and practiced ever since except for 4 years when he was in the dental corps" during World War I.

Gordon Long, son of George Edwin Long, grew up at Tyrone Place and later served in both the army and the air force.

== See also ==
- Charles Stewart
- Heritage buildings in Edmonton
- History of Edmonton
