= Make Something Edmonton =

Canadian city's community initiative (2013–2020)

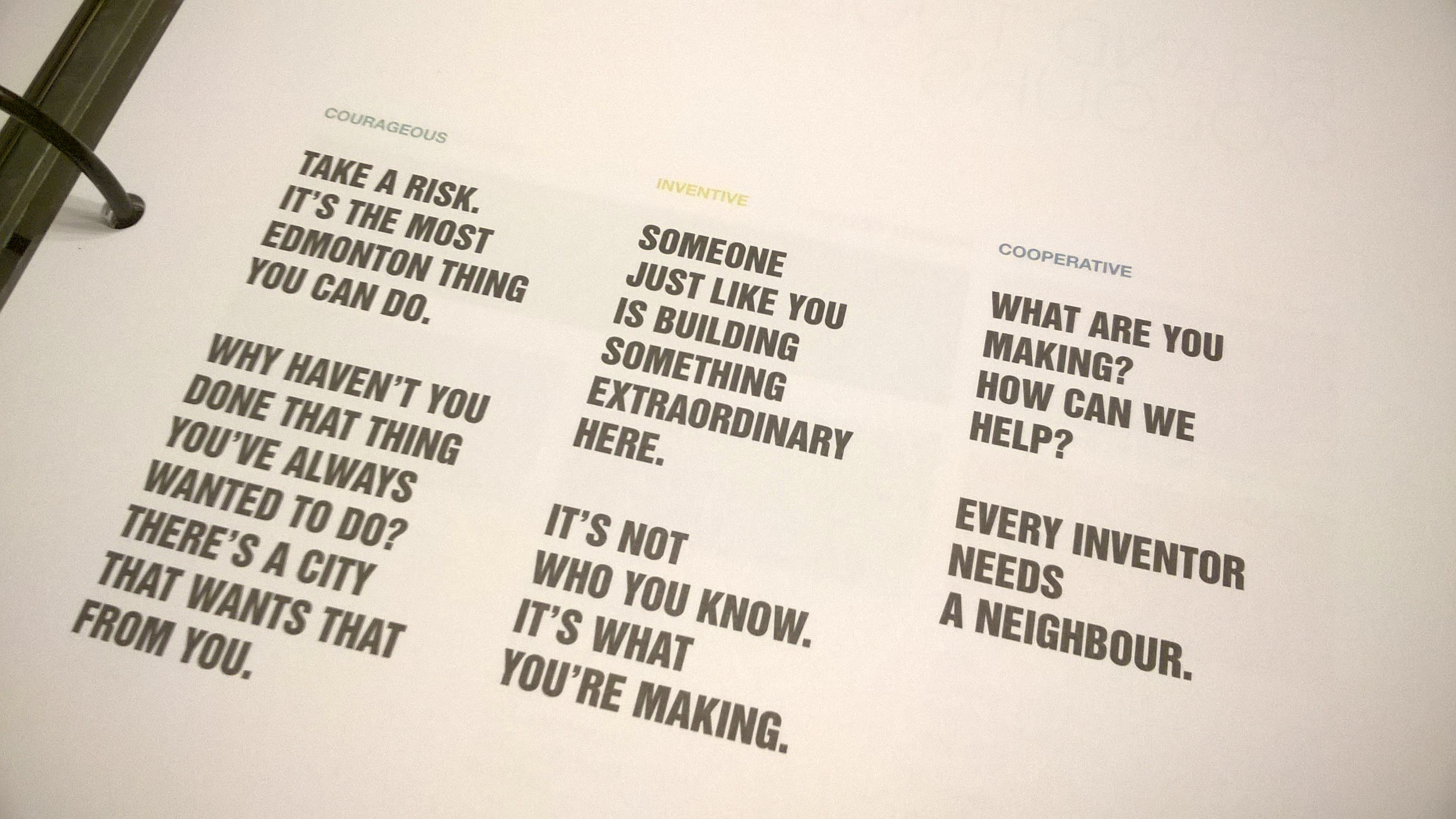

Make Something Edmonton is a community building initiative that resulted from the creation of a task force on the city's image and reputation, approved in July 2012 by the city council in Edmonton, Alberta. The task force was co-chaired by entrepreneurs Maureen McCaw (a onetime Chair of the Edmonton Chamber of Commerce) and Chris LaBossiere.

The work of the task force resulted in Make Something Edmonton, launched in March 2013.

At its launch, LaBossiere transitioned to co-chair of Make Something Edmonton, alongside Rapid Fire Theatre artistic director Amy Shostak. The creative concept behind the initiative was articulated by local writer and entrepreneur Todd Babiak.

The central idea behind the initiative is that "Edmonton is an unusually good city to create something from nothing, to launch a new idea, to build, to get ‘er done, to make something."

In 2014, the initiative was transferred to Economic Development Edmonton, with funding from the city. By January 2020, when Make Something Edmonton operated solely as an online platform, the City of Edmonton was announced that it would transfer the initiative to NextGen, an Administrative Committee in the city's Department of Citizen Services, and that the online platform would be archived and taken down pending new plans. In March 2020, the COVID-19 pandemic in Alberta slowed all activity at NextGen, and Make Something Edmonton had not been added to NextGen's list of initiatives by 2021; the NextGen committee was later cut from the city government.

== See also ==
- Keep Austin Weird
