= Northlands (organization) =

- Type: Non-profit Organization
- Founded: 1879
- Defunct: July 5, 2021; 5 years ago
- Headquarters: 53°34′2″N 113°27′15″W, Edmonton, Alberta, Canada
- Key people: Peter Male, CEO
- Website: www.northlands.com

Edmonton Northlands, operating as Northlands, was a non-profit volunteer organization in Edmonton, Alberta. The organization owned exhibition grounds in northeast Edmonton collectively known as the Edmonton Northlands, which included venues such as the Northlands Park raceway, the Edmonton Expo Centre, and Northlands Coliseum–the former home of the Edmonton Oilers. The organization also hosted the annual exhibition K-Days, and the agricultural show Farmfair International.

Northlands began to decline in the 2010s after the construction of a new downtown arena—Rogers Place—which is operated by the Oilers, and took on most of the major indoor events that had previously been held at Rexall Place. The organization had also taken out a $48 million loan to cover a recent expansion of the Expo Centre.

In 2018, after a failed proposal to redevelop Northlands Park and Rexall Place, Northlands began to close and divest its facilities: it transferred ownership of the Expo Centre and the Coliseum to the city as part of an agreement to forgive its debt. Operations of the Expo Centre were assumed by the Edmonton Economic Development Corporation (now Explore Edmonton), while the Coliseum was closed. Northlands Park closed in October 2018, being replaced by the Century Mile Racetrack and Casino in 2019. Amid further economic issues caused by the COVID-19 pandemic, Northlands was dissolved on July 5, 2021; stewardship of its events have been transferred to Explore Edmonton.

== History ==
Northlands was established in 1879, prior to the official incorporation of the city of Edmonton, and initially known as the Edmonton Exhibition Association. The organization consisted of a board, and a group of shareholders invited by the board. Past presidents of Northlands held voting status for life. The board of Northlands often included community members, and local and provincial political figures; this contributed to the power and influence of the group and its members. All of Northlands' board members were unpaid volunteers, although they were typically provided with perks such as free parking, and tickets to events held at its facilities.

While also operating as an agricultural society, Northlands was well known as an operator of venues in Edmonton; after the downtown Thistle Rink was destroyed in a fire, the association adapted a new livestock pavilion it had constructed in 1913 to be usable as a hockey rink, resulting in what was later renamed Edmonton Gardens after an expansion in 1948. Northlands later oversaw the construction of its replacement, the Northlands Coliseum. The Edmonton Oilers' original owner Charles Allard abandoned a proposal to build their own arena after being referred to Northlands, with partner Bill Hunter stating that "they asked us to support them because they felt our building would greatly impact and damage them."

Despite its emphasis on being a volunteer organization operating in the public interest, historian Tony Cashman observed that Northlands "became a sort of an exclusive club financed by the public" amid the Oilers' prominence under Wayne Gretzky, having "[gradually] redefined itself unilaterally as an entertainment giant, retaining the perks of an agriculture society and the insider position of an implied partner of the city." In 1989, the Northlands grounds were expropriated by the City of Edmonton and leased to Northlands under a 30-year term. The decision was met with criticism by the organization, due to it having developed and constructed the sites.

In 1994, caving to demands by Oilers owner Peter Pocklington (who had threatened to re-locate the team if he were not given the revenue from all events held at the venue), Northlands rented the Coliseum to him for $2.8 million per-year, under the condition that the Oilers remain in Edmonton through at least 2004. The rent agreement included a right of first offer clause, requiring that the Oilers be offered to local investors for a fixed price of US$70 million if a current or future owner announces their intent to re-locate it outside of Edmonton. In 1998, Leslie Alexander made an offer to acquire the Oilers, with an intent to re-locate the team to Houston as a companion to his NBA franchise, the Houston Rockets. This triggered the sale clause, and resulted in a consortium known as the Edmonton Investors Group (EIG) reaching an agreement to acquire the Oilers and keep them in Edmonton.

EIG reached an agreement to pay the Coliseum's operating costs and $1 in rent per-year, in exchange for the ability to retain revenue (such as ticket surcharges) from hockey events and the sale of naming rights. Northlands would continue to receive the revenue from all other events held at the Coliseum—which included the increasing number of concerts hosted by the arena. The city contributed $2.5 million per-year in grant money to compensate for the former rent agreement with Pocklington.

=== Rogers Place and decline, dissolution ===
With the Coliseum lagging behind newer NHL arenas in terms of amenities, discussions began over the construction of a new arena. Conflicts emerged between the Oilers' owners (including its later Katz Group ownership) and Northlands over aspects such as location (such as building it as part of a downtown sports and entertainment district), and whether Northlands would be involved in the new arena or related venues at all (with one proposal having Northlands operate a downtown casino near the arena, which would contribute a share of revenue to the new arena). The team's ownership, Oilers Entertainment Group, ultimately decided on a downtown arena which would become Rogers Place.

Northlands anticipated that the 2016 opening of Rogers Place would lead to a major loss in revenue, due to major events being held there instead of the Coliseum. It projected that it would be unable to repay $48 million in loans it had received from the city to cover an expansion of the Edmonton Expo Centre. In February 2016, the organization proposed a redevelopment of the Edmonton Northlands that it dubbed Vision 2020, which included turning the Coliseum into a multi-rink facility, ending horse racing at Northlands Park at the end of the 2016 season and converting it to an outdoor "urban festival" ground, and expanding the Expo Centre's Hall D into a 5,000-seat indoor arena (which it aimed as a venue for minor hockey championships, lacrosse, concerts, and rodeos). Northlands CEO Tim Reid stated that the plan was part of its effort to exit the "big arena game" and "find new ways to serve our community, as we have for over 137 years."

In August 2016, the Edmonton City Council rejected the proposal, citing that its budget was greatly underestimated due to its failure to account for design, public consultation, and a request by Northlands for its loan to be forgiven. It also questioned the demand for a new indoor arena, and felt that Northlands' plans for the proposed "urban festival" ground was too vague.

In July 2017, it was reported that Northlands had discussed divesting its facilities, and refocusing upon promoting agricultural innovation. On August 29, 2017, Edmonton reached an agreement to forgive Northlands' debt, in exchange for the Expo Centre and Coliseum being brought under city ownership effective January 1, 2018. The Expo Centre was brought under the Edmonton Economic Development Corporation alongside the downtown Edmonton Convention Centre, while the Coliseum was formally closed at that time. Northlands Park hosted its final horse races in October 2018, and its casino closed in January 2019. Northlands Park was succeeded by the new Century Mile Racetrack and Casino south of the city in April 2019.

On June 10, 2021, Northlands announced that it would dissolve effective July 5, 2021, and that stewardship of Farmfair International and K-Days would be assumed by Explore Edmonton moving forward. The group's financial difficulties had been further impacted by the COVID-19 pandemic, which caused K-Days to be cancelled in both 2020 and 2021.

== Facilities ==
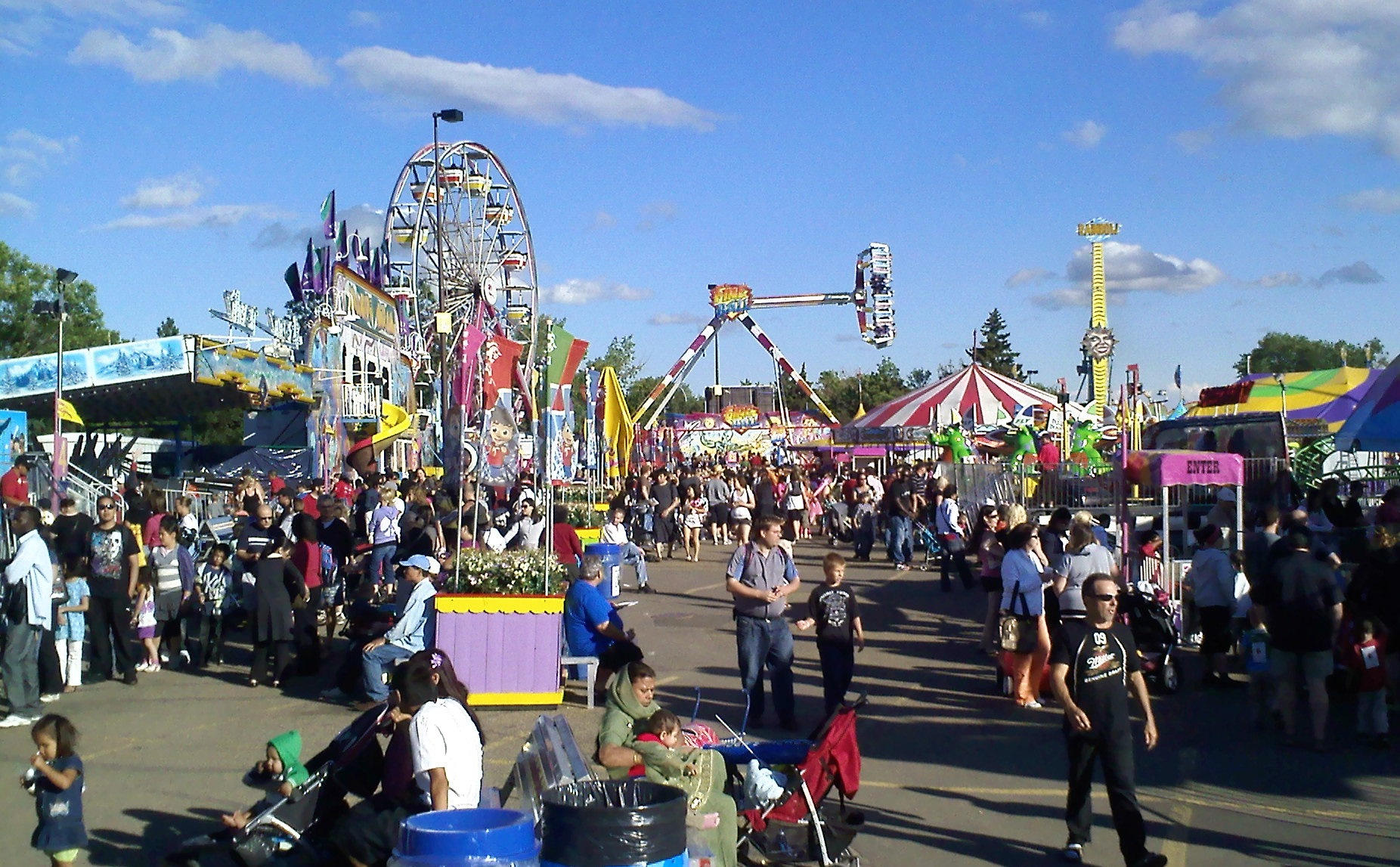
The midway at the 2010 K-Days

- Edmonton Expo Centre (1984–2017) – Completed in 1984, as the "Agricom", it underwent a 200,000-square-foot (19,000 m^{2}) expansion in 2009. The Edmonton Economic Development Corporation assumed operations on January 1, 2018.
- Northlands Coliseum (1974–2017) – Completed in 1974, previously named Edmonton Coliseum, Skyreach Centre, and Rexall Place. Closed January 1, 2018.
- Northlands Park (1951–2019) – Horse racing circuit completed in 1951 as the "Spectrum", renovated in 1995. Features over 625 slot machines, 700-seat restaurant, live harness and thoroughbred racing and simulcast racing from around the world. Closed on January 31, 2019.
- Northlands Sportex (1963–2008) – Convention hall built in 1963 and demolished in 2008 to make room for the expansion of the Edmonton Expo Centre.
- Edmonton Gardens (1913–1982) – Completed in 1913, held 5,200 spectators until its demolition after the completion of the Coliseum.
