= Edmonton Convention Centre =

Building in Alberta, Canada

- Interactive map of Edmonton Convention Centre
- Former names: Shaw Conference Centre (1997–2018)
- Address: 9797 Jasper Avenue; Edmonton, Alberta; T5J 1N9
- Coordinates: 53°32′29.15″N 113°29′10.07″W
- Owner: City of Edmonton
- Public transit: Central station

Construction
- Opened: June 22, 1983
- Expanded: 2006
- Construction cost: CA$81.8 million ($231 million in 2025 dollars)

Website
- www.edmontonconventioncentre.com

The Edmonton Convention Centre (ECC, known as the Shaw Conference Centre from 1997 to 2018), is a meeting, entertainment, and convention venue located in Edmonton, Alberta, Canada. Opened in 1983, it is managed by Explore Edmonton, the destination marketing organization of the city of Edmonton.

It is located on Jasper Avenue and built into a hill, emerging onto Grierson Hill Road and into the Louise McKinney Riverfront Park. The riverside site allows for approximately 70 per cent of the building space to be located underground, burrowed into the cliff face, concealing the fact that the building is over 10 stories high.

The venue has 144,406 sq ft (13,415.8 m^{2}) of exhibition space, including four exhibition halls, 20 meeting rooms, and a ballroom. It is reported by EEDC that the ECC boosts Edmonton's economy by an estimated $44 million a year.

== History ==
Plans for a city owned trade and convention centre, originally combined with sports (arena, stadium) facilities, had been considered for a number of years. A plebiscite asking if the city should spend $14 million ($143 million today) on land and construction of a downtown sports and convention complex was rejected by voters in 1963. Edmonton citizens voted in favour of a $23 million proposal ($201 million today) in the 1968 Convention and Sports Complex plebiscite, but voted against the revised $34 million ($275 million today) funding request in the 1970 Omniplex project plebiscite. The area on Grierson Hill where the centre now resides had a coal mine operation from 1892 to 1893, one of a number along the banks of the North Saskatchewan River near the turn of the century.

While voters had rejected the funding for the project, a municipal bylaw allowing the city to build was still on the books. The scope of the project was reduced when the Northlands Coliseum ice hockey arena opened in 1974, followed by the Commonwealth Stadium football facility in 1978. Edmonton City Council received support from the electorate to move forward with a more focused trade and convention centre in a special plebiscite in 1979. James Wensley was awarded the Alberta Association of Architects Citation in 1983 for his work on the facility.

In 1997, the facility was renamed the Shaw Conference Centre under a 20-year naming rights deal with Shaw Communications. The facility was renamed Edmonton Convention Centre in 2019 following the expiration of Shaw's naming rights.

In 1998, the facility added the Riverview Room. In 2006, the facility expanded with a new exhibit hall, Hall D.

On August 29, 2017, Edmonton's city council approved a plan for the Edmonton Economic Development Corporation (EEDC, now Explore Edmonton) to take ownership of the Edmonton Expo Centre from Northlands, effective January 1, 2018, as a condition of relieving debt owed to the city over its renovations.

In June 2019, it was announced that the ECC's glass atrium would be fitted with transparent solar panels as part of a $10.8 million project. The renovation was stated to be the largest building-integrated array of solar panels in the country, and it was estimated that the panels would produce 227,000 kilowatt hours of solar energy per-year. Installation was formally completed in June 2020; as an artistic component, the south roof was inscribed with the text of the poem "Gift of a river" by E. D. Blodgett, rendered in morse code.

== Location ==
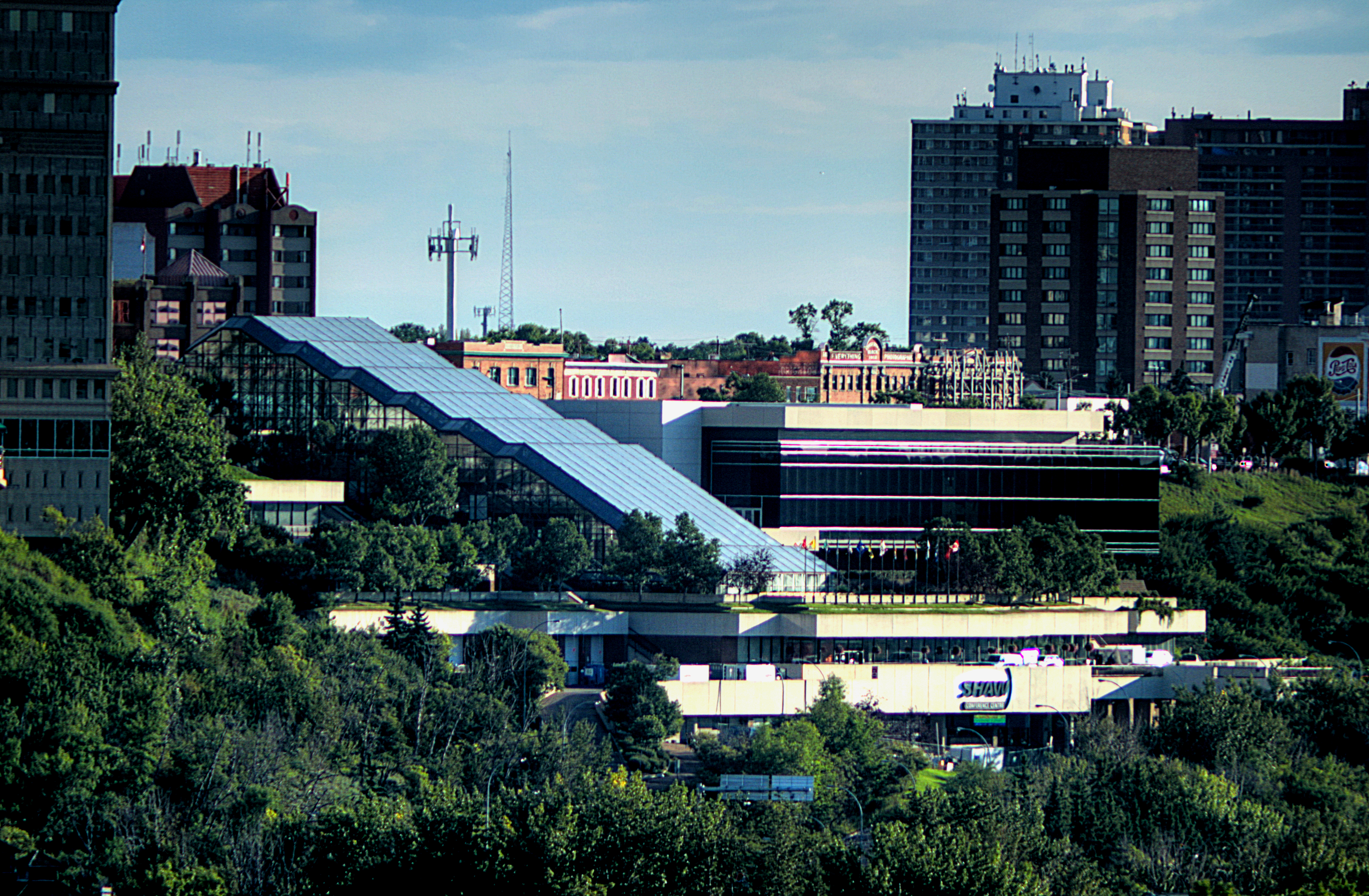
Edmonton Convention Centre on the North Saskatchewan River valley

The Edmonton Convention Centre is located on Jasper Avenue and 97th street in Downtown Edmonton and can be seen in the city's skyline. The Jasper Avenue entrance opens onto the centre's glass atrium, which in turn serves as the entrance to the multiple conference levels.

The long outer walls on the centre's assembly and meeting levels offer a view of the North Saskatchewan River valley parks system; a view which stretches from the downtown core to the north campus of the University of Alberta.

The centre is linked via pedway to Edmonton's Canada Place, which is the main property for federal government offices in Edmonton. Canada Place is linked, in turn, to many other buildings by way of Edmonton's pedway system, including, the Citadel Theatre, the Westin Hotel, the City Hall, the Sandman Signature Edmonton Downtown Hotel, and the Edmonton City Centre mall.

== Function ==
The facility has been used for corporate functions, banquets, conventions, as well as entertainment events such as concerts.

Edmonton's anime convention Animethon moved to the Edmonton Convention Centre in 2018, replacing the MacEwan University City Centre Campus.

=== Notable concerts ===
Amon Amarth performed at the Edmonton Convention Centre on September 30, 2019, as part of their Berserker tour. This show gained notoriety when, after Amon Amarth finished their set, an unidentified man stabbed a concertgoer, a 34-year old David Cox, who was involved in altercation and stabbed, and then died while hospitalized.
