= Arthur Harrison (commissioner) =

Canadian politician

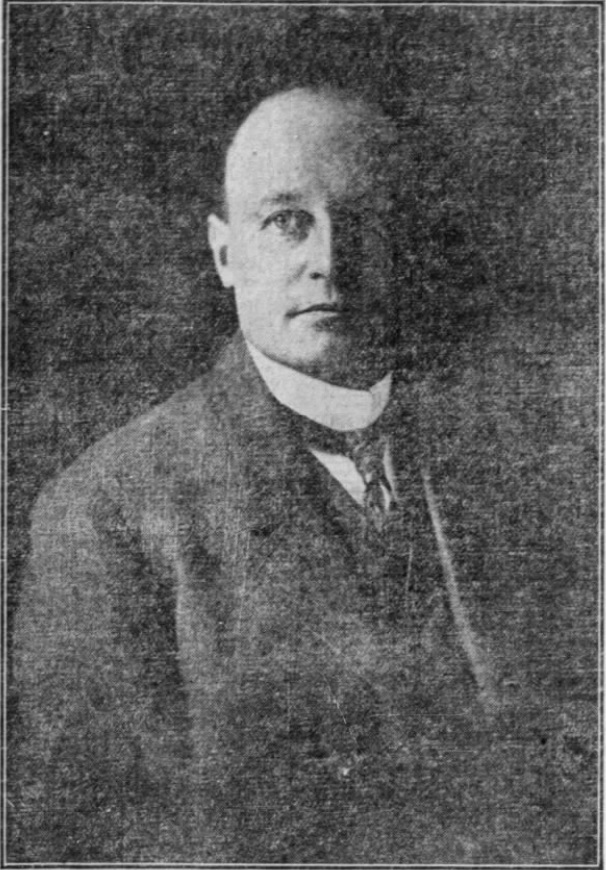
- Arthur G. Harrison in 1911

Personal details
- Born: Arthur Gregory Harrison; 2 September 1870 Fredericton, New Brunswick
- Died: 5 October 1954 (aged 84) Edmonton, Alberta
- Education: New Brunswick University (1891)
- Occupation: Politician, land agent, civil engineer

Arthur Gregory Harrison (1870-1954) was an author, lawyer and civil engineer who served as City Commissioner of the City of Edmonton in Canada from 1911 until 1918. He subsequently became President (and later secretary) of the Edmonton Exhibition Association.

== Background ==
Harrison was born in Fredericton, New Brunswick in 1870. He graduated from the University of New Brunswick in 1891 with a degree in civil engineering.

== Career ==
Following his graduation from the University of New Brunswick, Harrison sought employment with the Ohio and Pennsylvania Railroad in 1891. From 1899 until 1911 he worked as a land agent with the Dominion Lands Branch in Canada. From 1911 until 1918, Harrison served as City Commissioner in Edmonton. In 1914, Harrison was quoted in several newspapers discussing Edmonton’s municipally owned recreation grounds, which were presented in the press as part of the city’s broader program of municipal ownership of public services. Later that year, Harrison was appointed to represent Edmonton for the Alberta Town Planning Association and he published a report on Edmonton's municipal growth.

In 1973, Harrison Drive in Homesteader was named after Arthur Harrison.

== Personal life ==
Harrison married Florence Amanda Jackson in 1902 in Calgary, Alberta. Together they had one son and four daughters. Between 1902 until 1920, Harrison and his family resided at 10529 99 Avenue in Edmonton, Alberta. (Note: Prior to the renumbering of Edmonton's streets in 1914, this address was alternately known as 458 McKay Avenue and 10529 McKay Avenue.) Harrison became a widower in 1942 following the passing of his wife Florence on 27 June.

Harrison died on 5 October 1954.

== Bibliography ==
- Guide to the Omenica, Cassier, Liard, Klondyke and Yukon Gold Fields via the Edmonton Route (1897) - OCLC 41556339
- Report of the Commission on the Pork Industry in the Province of Alberta (1909) - OCLC 1007528567
- The Gairdner Harrison Prospector's Guide (reprint 2015) - ISBN 9781015238244
