= Explore Edmonton =

Destination marketing organization for Edmonton, Alberta

- Formation: 1993; 33 years ago
- Founders: City of Edmonton
- Purpose: Destination marketing
- Headquarters: World Trade Centre Edmonton, Edmonton, Alberta, Canada
- Region served: Edmonton Metropolitan Region
- Owner: City of Edmonton
- Key people: Angela Fong (Chair); Joseph Doucet (Vice-chair); Derek Hudson (CEO)
- Revenue: C$46.5 million (2017)
- Employees: 1,100 (2017)
- Website: www.exploreedmonton.com
- Formerly called: Edmonton Economic Development Corporation

Explore Edmonton Co. is a destination marketing organization in Edmonton, Alberta. It is involved in promoting Edmonton tourism, operating two of the city's event facilities—the Edmonton Convention Centre and the Edmonton Expo Centre.

It was formerly known as the Edmonton Economic Development Corporation (EEDC), and additionally acted as an economic development agency for the city. In 2019, Edmonton's city council voted in favour of splitting its economic development activities into a new innovation authority (which would be known as Innovate Edmonton). After the dissolution of Northlands in 2021, Explore Edmonton took over stewardship of K-Days and Farmfair International.

== History ==
The Edmonton Economic Development Corporation (EEDC) was founded by the City of Edmonton in 1993, as an independent, not-for-profit corporate entity. Its main objective was to provide leadership for the economic development strategy for the region.

On January 1, 2018, the EEDC took ownership of the Edmonton Expo Centre from Northlands, as part of an agreement with the city to forgive the latter's debt.

In August 2018, when Derek Hudson took over as CEO of EEDC, he said that his main goal in the position was to develop a more resilient, diverse economy, including focusing on the tourism and technology sectors.

In January 2019, EEDC announced that one of its goals was to move Edmonton away from its reliance on the oil industry, and said the Corporation would focus on industries such as arts and culture; sport; health; artificial intelligence; public service; and government, in moving towards this aim. In support of EEDC's goals, Edmonton Mayor Don Iveson said at the EEDC's 2019 luncheon that the city needs expansion and innovation across its industries instead of waiting for and relying on the oil market to rebound.

In December 2019, the Edmonton City Council voted on a notion to form a new, separate innovation authority, which would subsume some of the EEDC's existing economic development activities. As a result, the EEDC was to focus primarily on conventions and tourism. The city approved $5 million in annual funding for the new organization in May 2020, which would be known as Innovate Edmonton.

In April 2020, multiple senior leaders of the EEDC departed as part of layoffs by the corporation, primarily citing the economic impact of the COVID-19 pandemic in Alberta.

In September 2020, the EEDC announced that it had rebranded as Explore Edmonton.

In June 2021, Northlands announced that it would dissolve effective July 5, 2021, and that Explore Edmonton would take over the operations of K-Days and Farmfair International going forward.

== Funding ==
Explore Edmonton receives annual funding from the City of Edmonton, with the remainder of its budget coming from convention centre operations and government grants.

In November 2020, the organization requested "an increase in funding over the next three years to make up for declining revenues from facility and hotel bookings as a result of the [COVID-19] pandemic." The group has asked $18.8 million in 2022 and $14.5 million in 2023.
