= Edmonton Expo Centre =

Multi-purpose convention centre in Edmonton, Canada

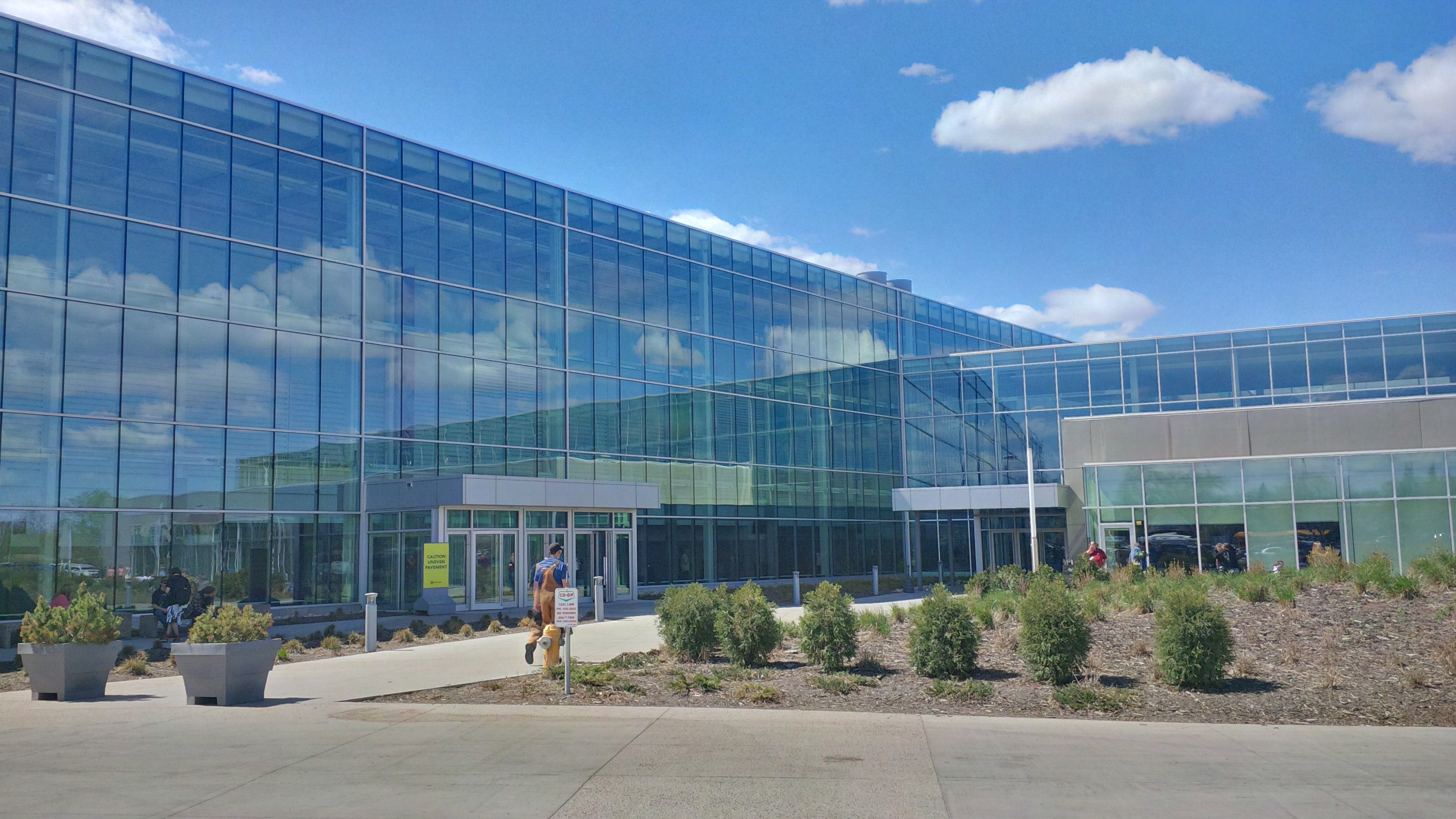
- Edmonton Expo Centre entrance
- Interactive map of Edmonton Expo Centre
- Former names: Northlands AgriCom (1984–2009)
- Address: 7515 118 Avenue NW
- Location: Edmonton, Alberta
- Coordinates: 53°34′7″N 113°27′29″W
- Owner: City of Edmonton
- Operator: Explore Edmonton
- Public transit: Coliseum station

Construction
- Built: 1983–1984
- Opened: April 14, 1984
- Renovated: 2022–2025
- Expanded: 2009

Tenants
- Edmonton Stingers (CEBL) (2018–present); Edmonton Ice (WHL) (1996–1998)

Website
- www.edmontonexpocentre.com

The Edmonton Expo Centre, formerly the Northlands AgriCom and also known as the Edmonton Exposition and Conference Centre is a multi-purpose convention centre in Edmonton, Alberta, Canada. Operated by Explore Edmonton on behalf of the City of Edmonton, it is located in Edmonton's Montrose neighbourhood, across the street from the former Northlands Coliseum.

The venue contains over 410,000 square feet of exhibition space, including seven exhibition halls, a ballroom, and a 4,600-seat arena (branded as the Flair Airlines Hangar for sponsorship reasons).

== History and use ==
The facility was built in 1984 on the site of the old Edmonton Gardens, the first home of the Edmonton Oilers. The Oilers moved across 118 Avenue in 1974 to the new Northlands Coliseum. Prior to 2009, the EXPO Centre was known as the Northlands AgriCom, or simply The Agricom, from the agricultural and commercial trade shows which it was built to host.

From 1996 to 1998, a portion of the venue was used as the home arena of the Edmonton Ice of the Western Hockey League. It was considered a substandard venue for the team, which was prevented from using the nearby Coliseum; Edmonton Sun writer Terry Jones described the arena as being an "abomination of a building", "with the atrocious situation of a reasonable $13.50 ticket price but a $10 Northlands parking price to go with it." The team would subsequently re-locate to Kootenay.

In 2002 the arena became host of the 2002 World Ringette Championships.

In December 2009, renovations were completed that doubled the facility's size to 522,000 sq ft (48,500 m^{2}), which was expected to make it the largest such facility in Canada outside of Toronto at the time. The additions included four new exhibition halls, and new conference centre named the Alberta Ballroom. The Alberta government contributed $50 million to the project, while the federal government contributed $25 million. The city loaned $48 million.

In 2010, the Edmonton Expo Centre hosted the last Powerama Motoring Expo, which it had hosted since the expo's inception in 1984.

In February 2016, as part of the "Northlands Vision 2020" proposal, it was revealed that Northlands hoped to upgrade the existing arena to a modernized 5,000-seat arena for concerts and sporting events. However, the 2016 opening of the new downtown arena Rogers Place, which replaced Northlands' Rexall Place as the home of Edmonton Oilers games and other major events, caused the organization to incur an increasing amount of debt due to lost event revenue.

In July 2017, it was reported that Northlands had been in private discussions with the city about its future. The organization intended to divest itself of Rexall Place, Northlands Park, and the Edmonton Expo Centre in order to focus on promoting agricultural innovation. On August 29, 2017, the city of Edmonton announced that it would take ownership of the Edmonton Expo Centre and forgive $42 million in debt. The venue's operations were merged with those of the downtown Shaw Conference Centre under the Edmonton Economic Development Corporation in 2018. The Northlands Coliseum was similarly taken over by the city on the same day, although it also ceased operations.

In June 2018, it was announced that the Edmonton Stingers of the newly established Canadian Elite Basketball League would play their home games at the Expo Centre.

In 2022, the facility began its $98 million rehabilitation project which included updates to the building envelope, roof replacement, mechanical and electrical upgrades, and installation of the largest rooftop solar array in Canada. The project was completed in March 2025. The same year, the Expo Centre sold naming rights to its arena to Flair Airlines, renaming it the "Flair Airlines Hangar".

The facility hosted TNA's Victory Road on September 26, 2025, as well as a taping of TNA Impact! on the following day. TNA returned to the Expo Centre and hosted Destination X on November 15, 2026.

Since 2019, the Expo Centre is also the host of the annual Halloween-themed electronic dance music festival Scream. The most recent Scream took place on October 30-31, 2026. Before 2019, the festival took place at the Edmonton Convention Centre and before that the Edmonton Event Centre. The Expo Centre has also hosted other various EDM festivals in the past such as Get Together and Bomfest.

== Facilities ==
Exposition areas
Hall	Square Feet	Booth Capacity	Reception Capacity
A	53,262	274	2,500
B	58,104	301	3,000
C	77,472	413	4,000
D (arena, Flair Airlines Hangar)	53,410	325	4,628
(D) Sales Ring	8,990	65	
E	53,836	253	2,500
F	39,156	181	3,500
G	29,328	138	3,000
H	36,126	178	3,250
Alberta Ballroom	16,545		1,200
Totals	417,239	2,063	26,450
