= David Hardy (cricketer) =

English cricketer

David Hardy (1877–1951) was an English cricketer active from 1904 to 1924 who played for Northamptonshire (Northants). He was born in Northampton on 2 August 1877 and died there on 22 January 1951. He appeared in 37 first-class matches as a righthanded batsman who bowled right arm medium pace. He scored over 499 runs with his highest score of 37 and took fourteen wickets with a best performance of six for 11.
