= Sacred Heart Church of the First Peoples =

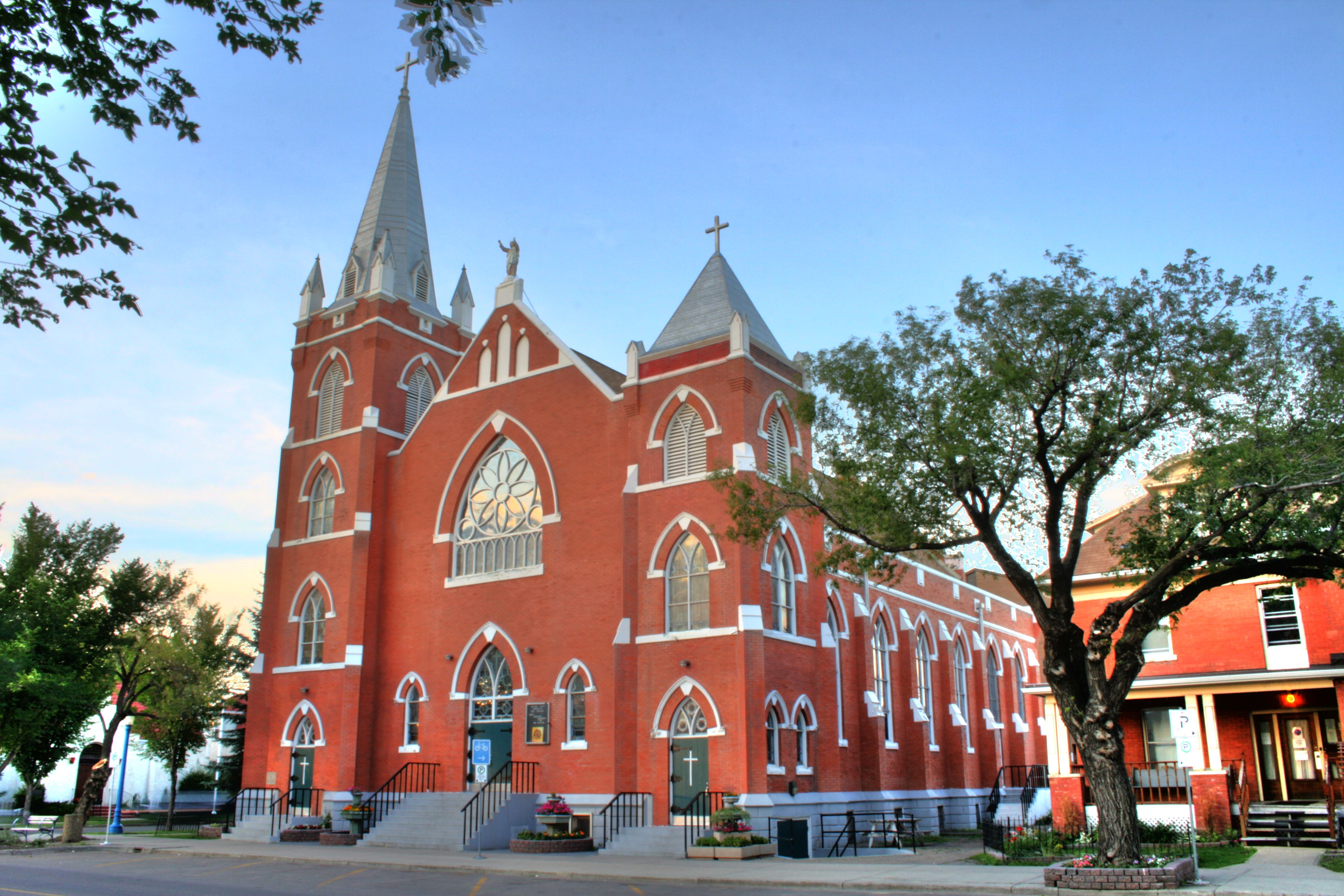
- East face of the Sacred Heart Church

- Location of Sacred Heart in Edmonton
- 53°33′18″N 113°29′14″W
- Location: 10821 96 Street NW; Edmonton, Alberta; T5H 2J8
- Denomination: Roman Catholic Church
- Website: sacredpeoples.com

History
- Former name: Sacred Heart Church
- Founded: December 25, 1913
- Dedication: Sacred Heart
- Other dedication: October 27, 1991

Architecture
- Functional status: Operational
- Architect: David Hardie
- Style: Gothic Revival

Administration
- Archdiocese: Edmonton
- Parish: First Nations, Métis, and Inuit national parish

The Sacred Heart Church of the First Peoples is a Roman Catholic church in Edmonton, Alberta. Opened as the Sacred Heart Church in 1913 to serve the city's rapidly growing population, Sacred Heart has been a historic "nursery" for many of Edmonton's immigrant Catholic parishes. In 1991, facing an aging congregation and declining weekly attendance, the parish's inner-city location was seen as an opportunity to serve Edmonton's growing urban Indigenous population. On October 27 of that year, the Archdiocese of Edmonton's Native Pastoral Centre was moved into Sacred Heart as Archbishop Joseph MacNeil declared the church to be a First Nations, Métis, and Inuit national parish, the first of its kind in Canada.

== History ==
In the early 1900s, an ongoing immigration rush to the Canadian West caused a rapid expansion of the Catholic Church in the region. Immaculate Conception Parish, the antecedent of Sacred Heart, was established in 1906 to accommodate immigrants to Edmonton. By 1911, Immaculate Conception was also over capacity. The solution was to reserve Immaculate Conception for Francophone Catholics, erecting under the same boundaries a new Sacred Heart Parish for all others. Sacred Heart opened on December 25, 1913, in what is today the historic McCauley neighbourhood. The building was designed by architect David Hardie. A fire destroyed much of the church on November 16, 1966, but was used as an opportunity to remodel the building around the updated liturgy of the Second Vatican Council.

A number of Edmonton's immigrant Catholic national parishes have operated out of Sacred Heart over the years, while gathering resources to build their churches. These include Italian (Santa Maria Goretti), Spanish (Our Lady of Guadalupe), Portuguese (Our Lady of Fatima), and Croatian (Nativity of Mary). An Eritrean community is still present in the building today, with approximately 600 attending weekly mass, along with a local branch of the Cursillo movement.

On August 30, 2020, Sacred Heart suffered a fire after smudging materials that had been discarded after a ceremony ignited on the ground floor of the building and spread to the walls and ceiling. The fire started shortly after 2 p.m. inside the church on the rear east side. The church was empty and no one was injured.

In spite of the fire, the Archdiocese of Edmonton says it will take the next steps to restore the church, as it did after a devastating prior fire in 1966. The Canadian Conference of Catholic Bishops expressed sympathy to the Sacred Heart Church of the First Peoples in Edmonton following the devastating fire.

Sacred Heart announced a fundraising effort to rebuild the church, with a $2 million goal. The rebuild was completed just in time for Pope Francis' Penitential Pilgrimage of Reconciliation. On Monday July 25, 2022, Pope Francis visited Sacred Heart Church of the First People, repeating and reinforcing the historic apology he made the previous day at Maskwacis, and positioning the church as a "house of reconciliation."

== First Peoples ==
Because of its proximity to downtown Edmonton and its attendant population of transient and homeless people, many of them Indigenous Canadians, Sacred Heart began to accrue more and more social responsibilities. An annual volunteer-run free Christmas dinner began in 1971, and a food bank started operating out of the church basement in 1980. At the same time, an aging congregation led to declining attendance. The Archdiocese made the decision to merge the faltering parish with its Native Pastoral Centre, then operating out of a converted downtown warehouse.

On October 27, 1991, Archbishop Joseph MacNeil declared the church to be a First Nations, Métis, and Inuit parish, creating the Sacred Heart Church of the First Peoples. The parish was placed under the direction of the Missionary Oblates of Mary Immaculate, an order historically specializing in Indigenous ministry and mission. As the first Catholic church in Canada so designated, Sacred Heart's interior is adorned with Indigenous symbolism, such as the medicine wheel, the rainbow as a bridge to the next world, and the eagle as a symbol of God. A number of murals and paintings by Indigenous artists are displayed in the nave. Sunday Mass begins with a smudging ceremony, and the tabernacle is housed inside a teepee.

The poorest Catholic parish in Edmonton, Sacred Heart's outreach ministries are an important part of downtown Edmonton's network of social services. Holding free community meals on a monthly basis, the church also serves as the epicenter of a Christmas hamper charity program, and provides funerals at no cost for those who cannot afford them.

Former pastor Jim Holland, who served at Sacred Heart from 1995 to 2017, has been recognized for his leading role in the parish's revitalization. In 2016, the City of Edmonton renamed 108A Avenue "Father Jim Holland Way", and in 2017, Holland was inducted into the Alberta Order of Excellence.

In September 2017, Holland was succeeded by Fr. Susai Jesu, OMI, a Cree-speaking missionary Oblate from originally from India. Susai had learned to speak Cree during his prior Canadian assignments with Indigenous communities in Pelican Narrows and Sandy Bay, Saskatchewan.

Within the next year, Susai had "won the hearts of many people since he came in this parish", and was honoured with an eagle feather by seven local elders in November 2018.
