= David Hardie (architect) =

Canadian architect (1882–1959)

- Born: 11 October 1882; Glasgow, Scotland
- Died: 7 November 1959 (aged 77); Vancouver, British Columbia, Canada
- Occupation: Architect
- Buildings: Sacred Heart Church; Tyrone Place; Armstrong Block; Hecla Block; Hilltop House

David Hardie was a Canadian architect. Although Hardie was born in Glasgow and died in Vancouver, he is known for a number of buildings he designed in Edmonton, Canada.

== Background ==
Hardie was born in Glasgow in 1882. Hardie apprenticed in Perth under Scottish architect David Smart. From 1911 to 1913, Hardie worked out of his office in Edmonton's Victoria Block on First Street. In 1911, he designed the Sugurman Block at 10073 Jasper Avenue. From 1913 to 1920, he worked with architect John Martland at 9638 105 Street.

Hardie applied to the Architectural Institute of British Columbia in 1927 after left Edmonton shortly thereafter. Following his relocation to British Columbia, Hardie's former partner, John Martland, partnered with architect Gordon Aberdeen the Quincy Building at 10057 Jasper Avenue.

== Notable buildings ==
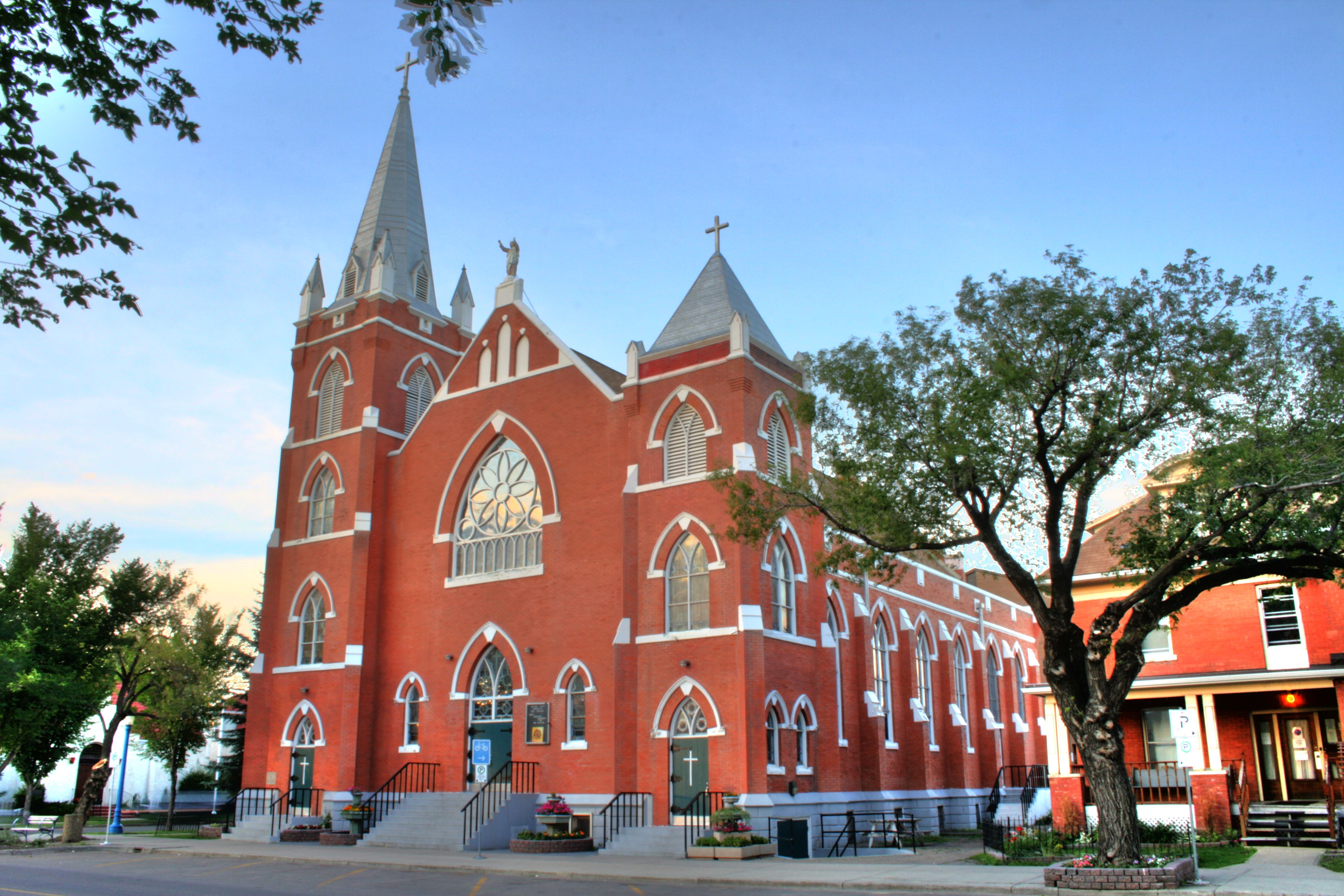
Hardie was the architect for Sacred Heart Church built in Edmonton in 1913

=== Hilltop House ===
Hardie designed the Hilltop House in Edmonton.

Regarding John Martland, John Blue wrote in 1924 that Martland "formed a partnership with David Hardie and as architects they were building up a substantial business when Canada entered the World War."

=== Hecla Block ===
Hardie was also involved in the Hecla Block. In Jac McDonald's 1987 book Historic Edmonton, McDonald explains that in 1913, John Johnson "engaged architects David Hardie and John Martland to draw up the plans for the Hecla, to be situatied on what was then known as Syndicate Avenue and Stewart Street. A building permit was granted in April 1914 indicated the block's value at $40,000." McDonald also wrote that Sacred Heart Church "was designed by local architects David Hardie and John Martland. While little is known of Hardie, Martland was later to become the City of Edmonton architect and a president of the Alberta Association of Architects. He also designed the Hecla Block apartments."

=== Other buildings ===
Hardie designed Edmonton's Tyrone Place in 1912 and Sacred Heart Church of the First Peoples in 1913.

== Personal life ==
Hardie travelled Europe in 1913.

== See also ==
- Sacred Heart Church of the First Peoples
- Tyrone Place
