= Northlands Park =

Horse racing track in Edmonton, Alberta

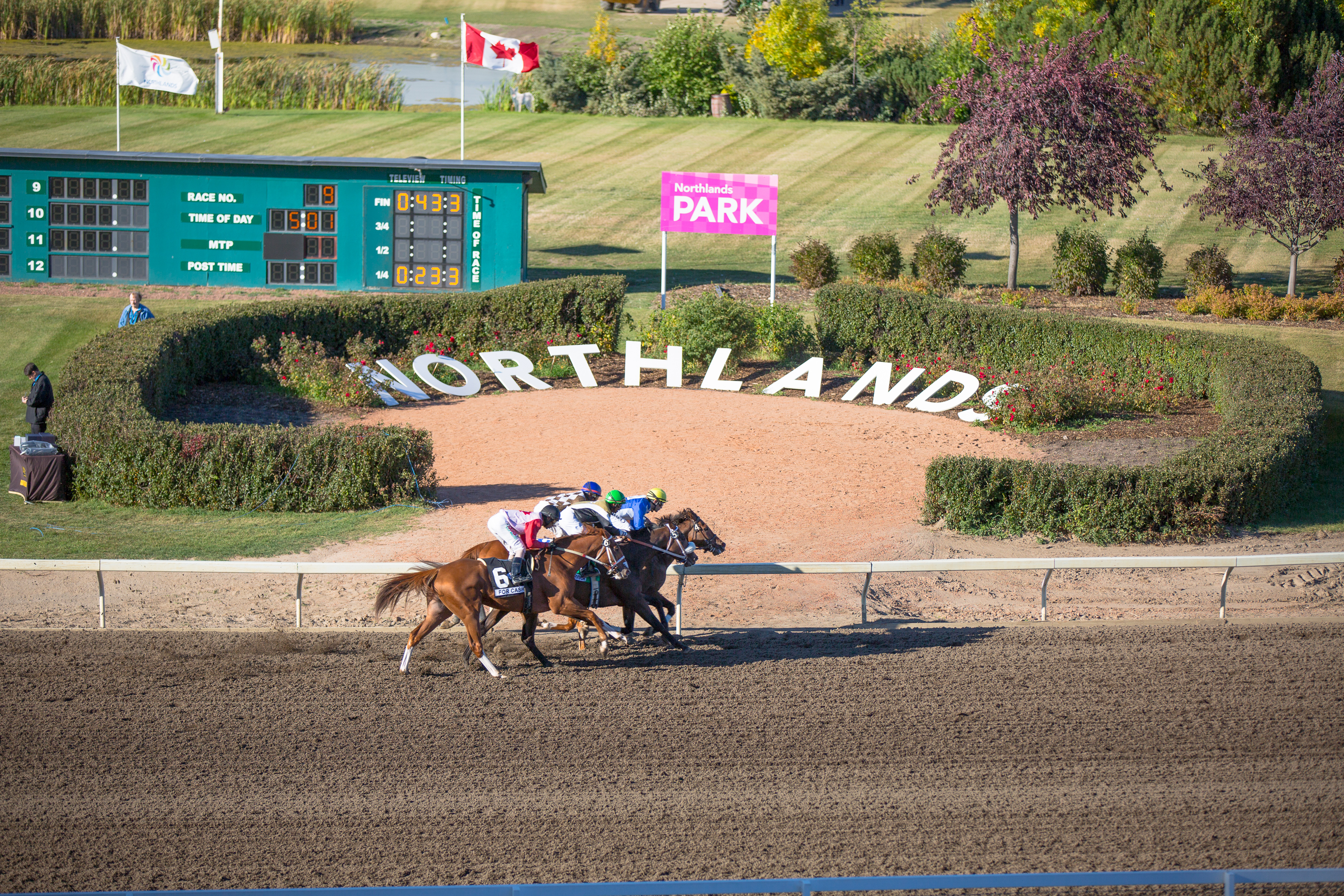
- Northlands Park, September 2014
- Interactive map of Northlands Park
- Location: Edmonton, Alberta
- Coordinates: 53°33′58″N 113°27′30″W
- Owned by: Northlands
- Date opened: 1900
- Date closed: January 31, 2019
- Race type: Thoroughbred, Harness

Northlands Park was the "Alberta A circuit" horse racing track at Northlands in Edmonton, Alberta. The horse racing season generally consisted of a spring harness (Standardbred) meet from February/March, a Thoroughbred meet from May/June to September/October and a fall harness meet to mid-December. Northlands Park (formerly Northlands Spectrum) was the building name for the grandstand.

There were three dining areas on the second floor. Colours was the main dining room overlooking the race track and had a seating capacity of 700. Uplinks Theatre was the simulcast restaurant area and featured 6 projection televisions and up to 26 different simulcast race broadcasts from North American tracks and Sha Tin in Hong Kong. Playbook Lounge was open limited hours and was available for private functions, sports broadcast events (27 televisions) and private parties. There were two other concessions on the second floor - Rock's and The Deli - that were open during live horse racing.

The track opened in 1900 to replace Rossdale Flats with upgrades in 1995 and 2005.

The Slots at Northlands Park were the main-floor slot machine gaming room and featured Las Vegas-style slot machines and VLTs and had two dining areas - the Slot Lounge and the Slot Grill.

The Paddock Theatre hosted the post position draw for the Canadian Derby, Northlands Park's largest and most prestigious annual thoroughbred race. Directly outside of the Paddock Theatre was the outdoor paddock area - featuring a barbecue concession window with beer service, paddock viewing terrace and the race commentary television broadcast room.

Northlands Park was also the corporate operating name for Edmonton Northlands. The name was adopted from the race track name in 1995 and changed to Northlands in 2006.

In 2016, Northlands announced its intent to close Northlands Park at the end of the season, and redevelop the land as an "urban festival" ground. This was part of a redevelopment plan stemming from the succession of Northlands-owned Rexall Place by Rogers Place as Edmonton's main indoor arena. The redevelopment plan was rejected by the Edmonton City Council, with the council in particular considering its plans for Northlands Park to be too vague. In response to the announcement, Horse Racing Alberta solicited bids for a new Alberta A circuit south of the city, which was awarded to Century Casinos. Northlands Park closed on January 31, 2019. Its successor, the Century Mile Racetrack and Casino, opened on April 1, 2019. Demolition began in October 2023.

== See also ==
- List of casinos in Canada
