= David Hardie (physician) =

Australian medical practitioner

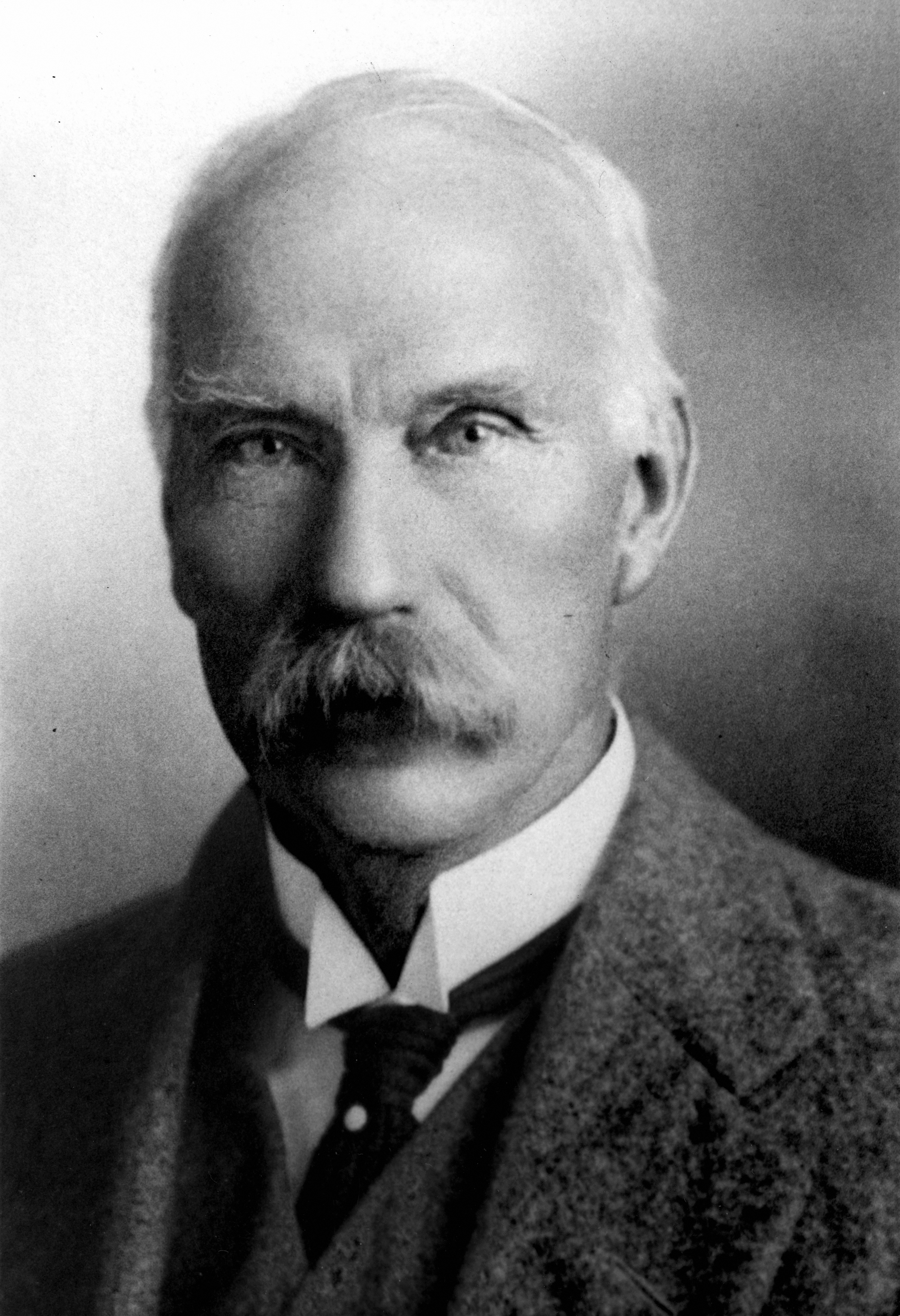
Sir David Hardie (1856–1945)

Sir David Hardie (4 June 1856 – 11 November 1945) was an Australian medical practitioner. Living and working in Queensland, he specialised in the diseases of women and children, particularly those related to Queensland's climate.

== Early life ==
Hardie was born on at New Spynie near Elgin, Morayshire, Scotland, son of John Hardie, farmer, and his wife Margaret (née Masson). He attended school in Elgin before furthering his education at the University of Aberdeen (M.B., Ch.B., 1878), he worked there for two years as a demonstrator in anatomy, then started general practice in 1880 at Forres, Morayshire. On 6 June 1883 he married Marianne Jeans at Nairn. She was the daughter of Alexander Jeans and Isabella Blythe.

His eldest daughter M.I.H. Hardie, (known as Helena) was born in 1886 at Forres. After gaining his medical doctorate at Aberdeen in 1887, David Hardie emigrated with his wife and daughter to Melbourne, Australia. They soon after settled in Brisbane and he was registered in Queensland on 5 May 1887. Living initially at Stanley Villa on the south bank of the Brisbane River, he settled finally in Wickham Terrace. In 1889 his only son John Hardie, was born. In 1893, David's youngest daughter (and biographer), Jean Blythe Scot Hardie was born.

== Medical career ==
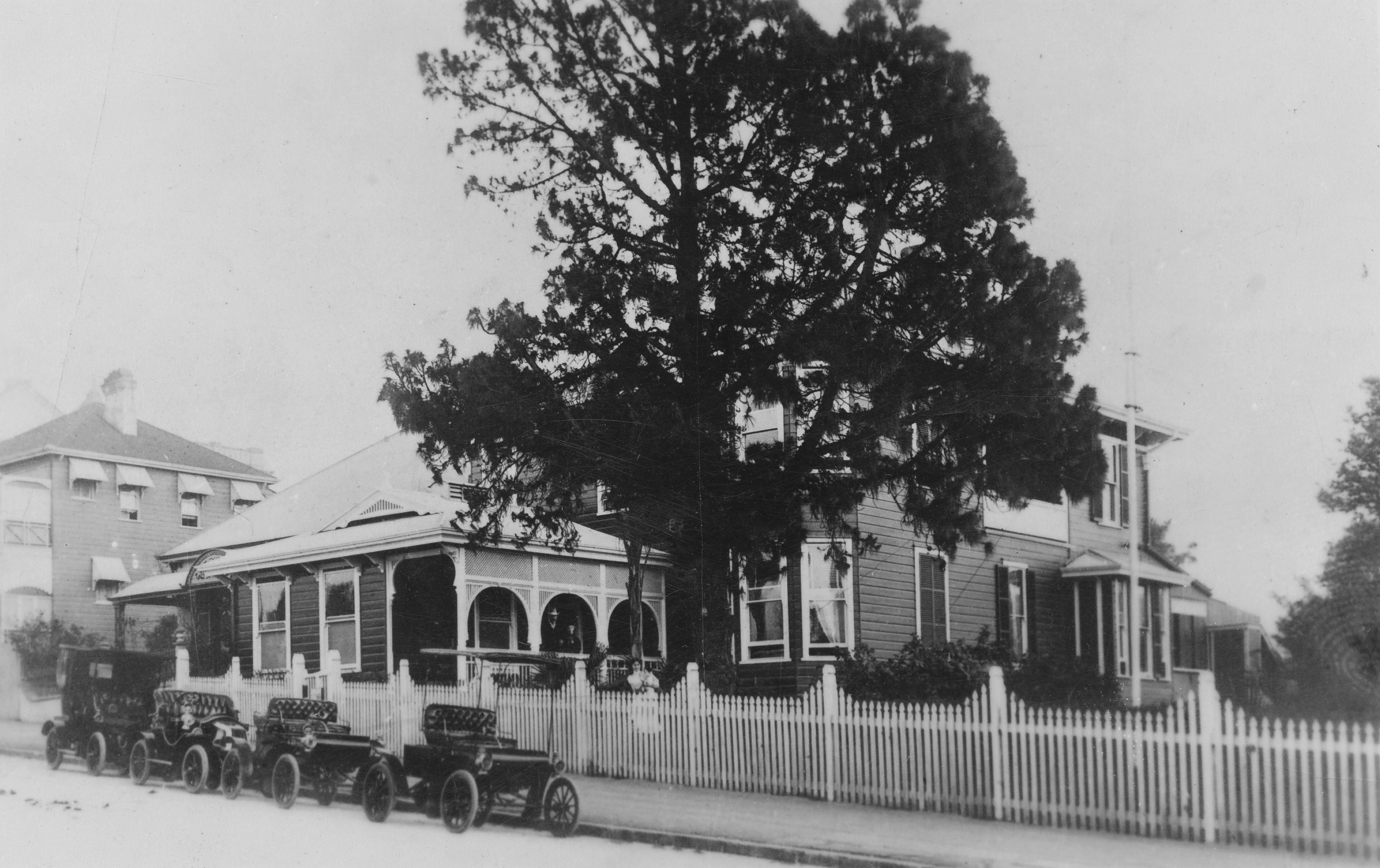
Firhall, Sir David Hardie's residence in Wickham Terrace, Brisbane, circa 1910

Hardie specialised in the diseases of women and children, particularly those arising from climate. In 1893, he became president of the Medical Society of Queensland, which became a branch of the British Medical Association, the predecessor of the Australian Medical Association. On a visit to Europe in 1895 (with his wife and 3 children) he investigated Röntgen's work on x-rays but although he brought radiology equipment to Australia he did not pursue the work. During this trip he spent some time back in Moray with his ailing father, and also with his elder brother John's family at Westerton Farm, Pluscarden. In 1902 he built Firhall in Wickham Terrace where he resided and practised.

Hardie was a capable family physician and popular with patients in all levels of society. He won many distinctions and became Queensland president of the British Medical Association in 1910 and 1920. He was a foundation member of the University of Queensland Senate between 1911 and 1916 and chaired the Emmanuel College Council from 1911 to 1940. He joined the Royal Army Medical Corps and served with it in France in 1915–16. Hardie was a staunch Presbyterian and after the war he became the first chairman of the Presbyterian and Methodist Schools Association. He was an honorary physician for years to the Hospital for Sick Children, the Lady Bowen Hospital and the Lady Lamington Hospital and also served on the Central Board of Health from 1894 to 1915 and the Medical Board of Queensland from 1894 to 1934. He published numerous journal articles and one book in 1893, Notes on Some of the More Common Diseases in Queensland in Relation to Atmospheric Conditions.

Hardie retired from active practice in 1922 and investigated the treatment of tuberculosis in England and Switzerland in 1922 and 1923 on behalf of the Queensland government. In 1927 he became a founding fellow of the (Royal) Australasian College of Surgeons. From 1928, he helped form the Rev. John Flynn's Aerial Medical Service of the Australian Inland Mission (now the Royal Flying Doctor Service) and fostered the development of Alfred Traeger's pedal radio.

== Later life ==
Sir David Hardie died in Brisbane on 11 November 1945. He was cremated at Mount Thompson Crematorium. His patients had ranged from the vice-regal to the humblest citizen. He was survived by his wife and three children.

His son John later followed in his father's footsteps as a distinguished GP. He was awarded the Military Cross during his medical war service in World War I.

== Honours ==
On the recommendation of the Denham ministry, he was awarded a Knighthood Kt in the New Year honours list for 1913 and thus became Queensland's first medical Knight. In 1919, the University of Aberdeen awarded him an honorary LL.D.
