= The Algonquin Resort =

Historic hotel in St. Andrews, New Brunswick, Canada

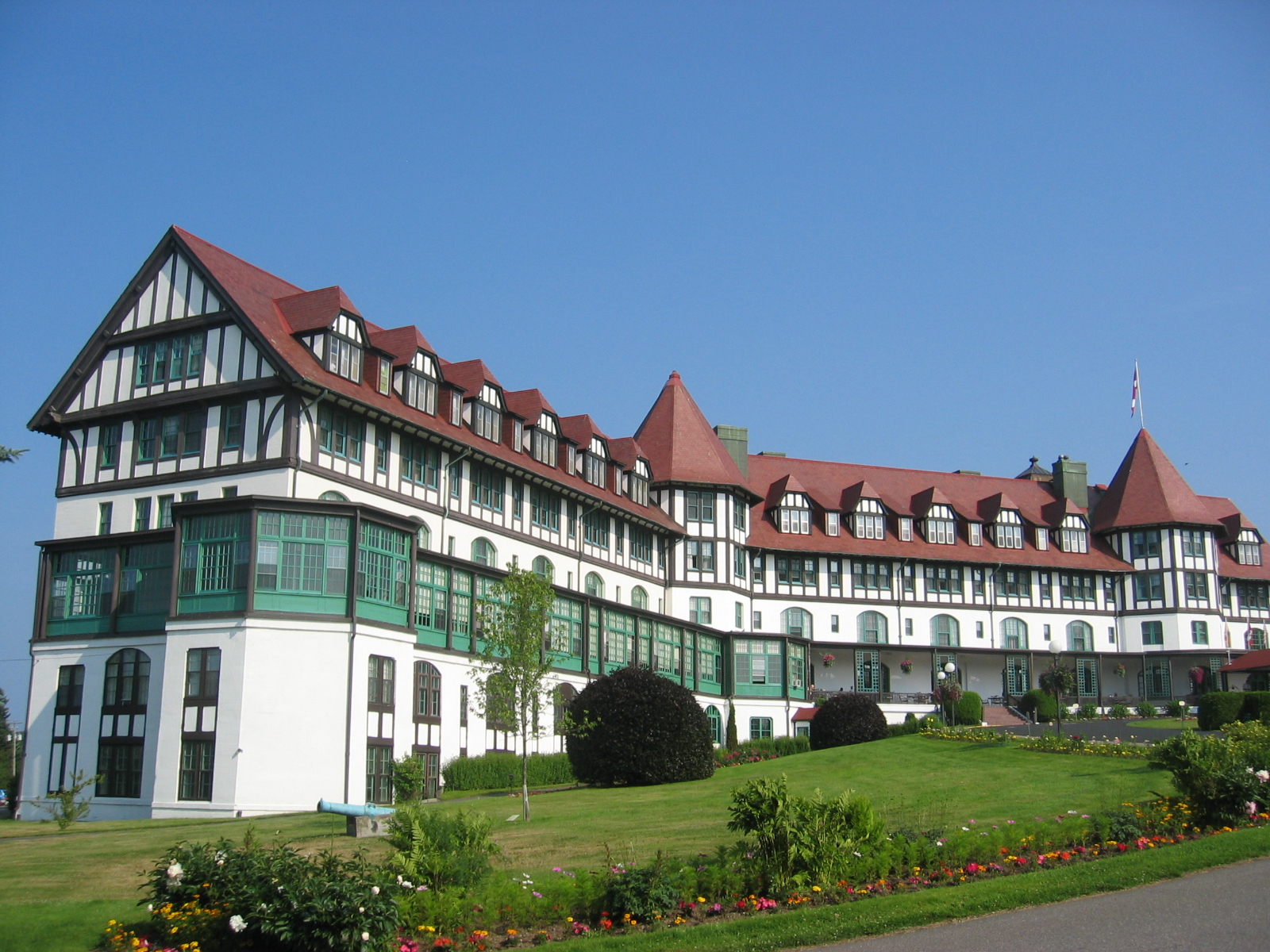
- The Algonquin Resort
- Interactive map of the The Algonquin Resort area

General information
- Location: St. Andrews, New Brunswick, Canada
- Coordinates: 45°04′49″N 67°03′17″W
- Opened: June 1889
- Owner: Charlotte County Hospitality Partnership
- Operator: New Castle Hotels & Resorts

Height
- Top floor: 4

Technical details
- Floor count: 4
- Lifts/elevators: 2

Other information
- Number of rooms: 235
- Number of restaurants: 4

Website
- www.algonquinresort.com

The Algonquin Resort is a Canadian coastal resort hotel in the Tudor Revival style, located in St. Andrews, New Brunswick. An architectural icon of New Brunswick, the hotel is the most famous symbol of St. Andrews and one of the most photographed buildings in the province.

== History ==
The original Algonquin hotel was a massive wooden Shingle Style building built in 1889 by the St. Andrews Land Company, established in 1883 by American businessmen. Designed by a Boston architecture firm, it contained 80 guest rooms and opened in June of that year. By the late 19th century, the residents of St. Andrews and businessmen from Montreal and New England helped to develop the summer tourism that the hotel was creating among residents of humid inland cities of North America. The entire hotel, except for two later wings built in 1908 and 1912, succumbed to a 1914 fire and was destroyed. It was replaced on its same footprint by the present four-story Tudor Revival concrete replacement with a faux half-timbered façade and red slate roof. The architects of the 1914 hotel, which is essentially what is considered the present-day Algonquin, were Barott, Blackadder & Webster of Montreal. Large additional wings were added in the early 1990s and in the early 2010s.

One of the original Algonquin's best known attractions was its saltwater baths. Saltwater was pumped from the Passamaquoddy Bay to the hotel atop the hill overlooking St. Andrews and held in water tanks in the hotel attic. Guests used bathtubs designed with four taps, two for fresh water and two for saltwater.

In addition to the saltwater baths, the air offered by the Bay of Fundy, along with the local "Samson Spring" were believed to offer healing properties to guests. Advertising proclaiming "No hay fever here" and "A general air of restfulness" attracted many wealthy tourists, some of whom established elaborate summer "cottages" in the town of St. Andrews and its surrounding countryside.

The New Brunswick Railway operated the rail line serving St. Andrews. One of the principal private shareholders of the NBR was also the first president of the CPR (1881–1888), George Stephen. Stephen started the process which would see CPR purchase the NBR, as well as build a line across Maine from southern Quebec to connect with the rail network. This latter line would be known as the International Railway of Maine. In 1888, Stephen retired and was replaced by William Cornelius Van Horne, who, on July 1, 1890, oversaw the Canadian Pacific Railway's lease of the NBR for 990 years.

That summer, Van Horne also visited St. Andrews, staying in its resort hotel. Van Horne, a Montreal resident, purchased nearby Minister's Island and soon began construction of his Covenhoven estate, which still stands today.

Van Horne retired from the presidency in 1899, opting to spend more time at Covenhoven. In 1903, the Canadian Pacific Railway Company purchased The Algonquin and built golf courses and brought the hotel into its hotel chain. A 1902 CPR promotional brochure describes The Algonquin "an incomparable resting-place and retreat from the cares of business and the heat and dust and bustle of the city"

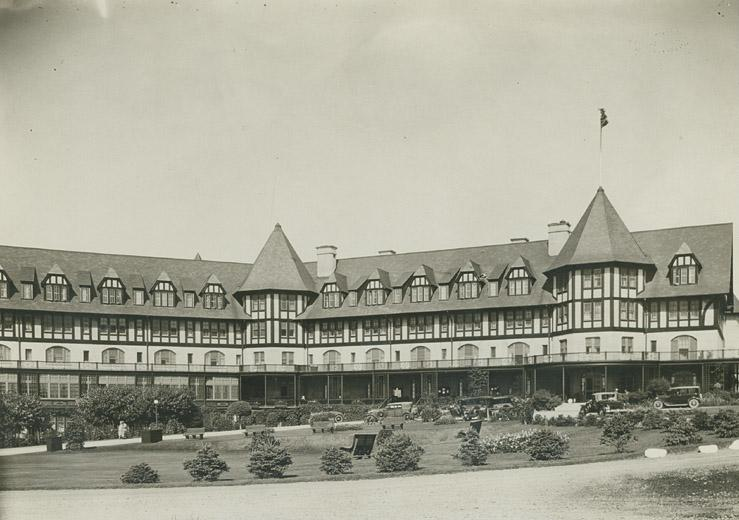
The Algonquin Resort in the 1920s

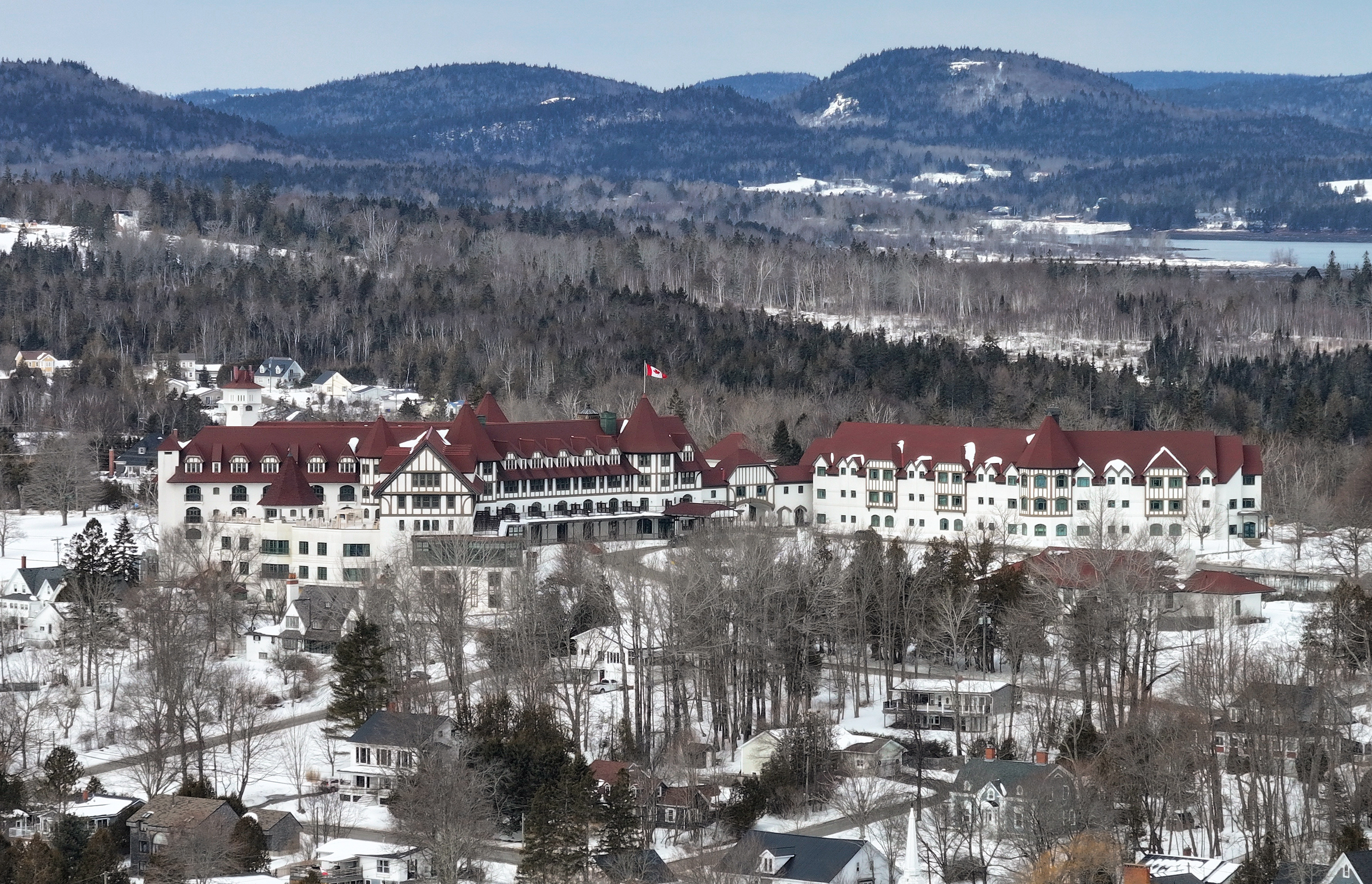
The Algonquin Resort during winter

Under CPR ownership, the resort operated with numerous guests during the 20th century. As the majority of guests arrived at St. Andrews by passenger train, CPR built a large transfer station at the junction between the St. Andrews line and the Saint John-Montreal main line in McAdam, New Brunswick. This station also included a large 30-room hotel on its second floor, largely built to service the patrons of the St. Andrews resort.

In 1970, CPR sold the Algonquin Resort to local interests. It was then leased by the Government of New Brunswick in 1973. The property, along with adjacent golf courses and private beach at Katy's Cove, was purchased entirely by the provincial government in 1984. Throughout this period of change in ownership of the property, the resort was continuously contracted to operate under and be marketed by Canadian Pacific Hotels and Resorts.

In 1999, CPR purchased Fairmont Hotels and Resorts. In 2001, Canadian Pacific Hotels and Resorts were consolidated under the Fairmont name. Later that year in October 2001, Canadian Pacific Limited spun off its subsidiaries, including Fairmont Hotels and Resorts into individually controlled companies.

The hotel's guests have included heads of state and royalty such as presidents of the United States Theodore Roosevelt, Franklin Delano Roosevelt, and Lyndon B. Johnson, British Royals HRH Prince Charles and Diana, Princess of Wales, Canadian prime minister John A. Macdonald, and virtually every other prime minister of Canada since its Confederation.

In late 2010, the Fairmont chain asked the government of New Brunswick for a set amount of money in order to refit the property on a large scale. After deliberation, the province made the decision in early 2011 to seek different management for the property other than the Fairmont chain. Beginning 31 Dec 2011, the Fairmont website stated that Fairmont would no longer be managing the property, and that all Fairmont club benefits for guests would cease. The hotel was sold in 2012 to New Castle Hotels and Resorts and Southwest Properties, which formed the Charlotte County Hospitality Partnership, and in 2012 underwent renovation and restoration. In 2013, the resort was reopened as a property of Marriott's Autograph Collection, making it the first Canadian Autograph Collection hotel in the Marriott chain.

In 2023, the Algonquin hotel and its golf course was purchased by InnVest Hotels.
