= Fairmont Palliser Hotel =

Building in Alberta, Canada

Coordinates: 51°02′40.0″N 114°03′54.8″W

Fairmont Palliser

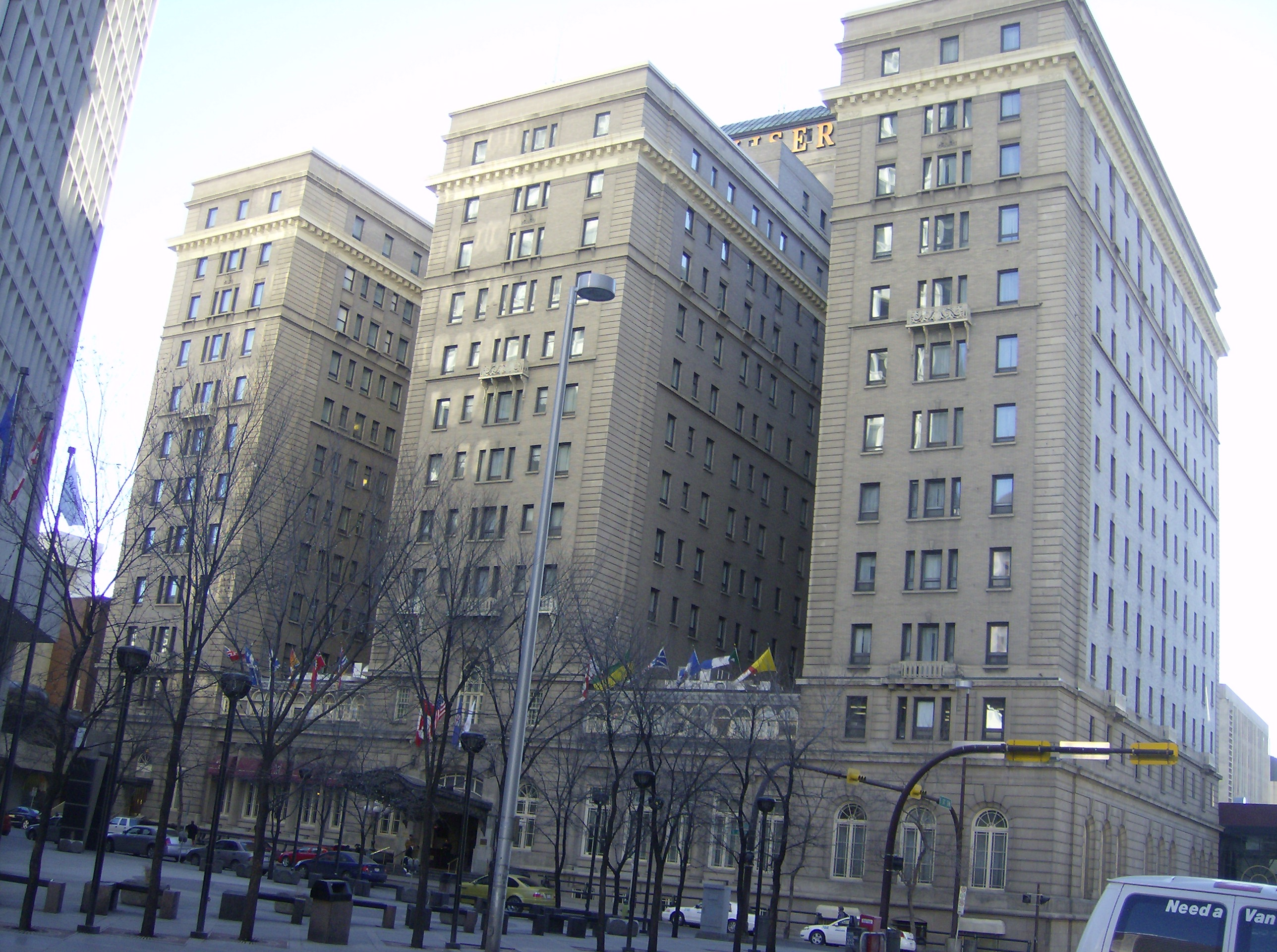
- Interactive map of the Fairmont Palliser area

General information
- Location: 133 9th Avenue SW; Calgary, Alberta, Canada
- Opening: 1 June 1914
- Owner: InnVest Hotels
- Operator: Fairmont Hotels and Resorts

Technical details
- Floor count: 12

Design and construction
- Architects: Lawrence Gotch, Edward Maxwell & William Sutherland Maxwell

Other information
- Number of rooms: 407

Website
- www.fairmont.com/palliser

The Fairmont Palliser, formerly known as the Palliser Hotel, is a hotel of the Canada-based Fairmont Hotels and Resorts chain. The hotel opened in 1914 and is located in downtown Calgary, Alberta, at 133 9 Avenue SW adjacent to the Calgary Tower and Palliser Square. The Palliser is one of Calgary's oldest and most luxurious hotels.

== History ==
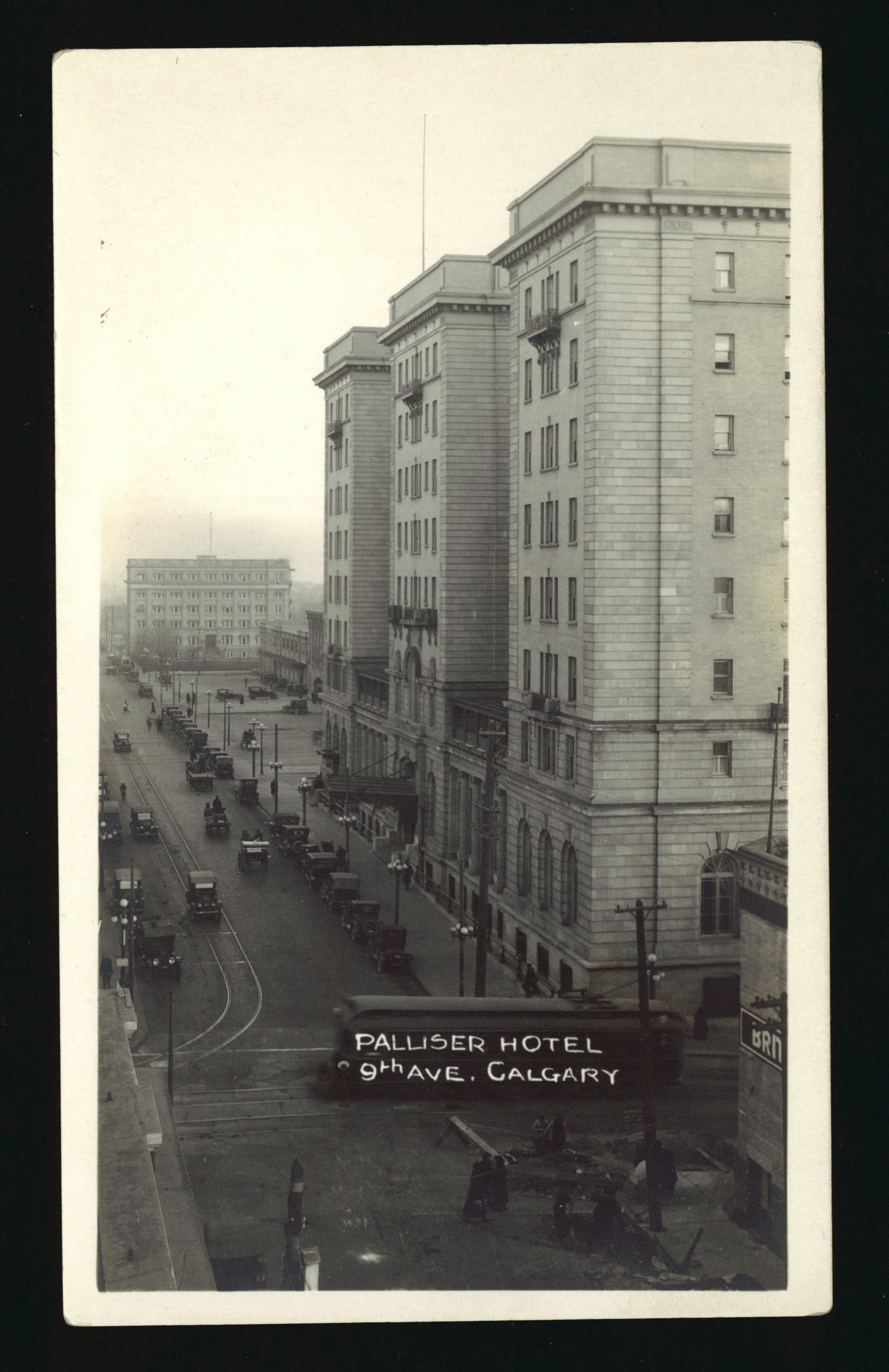
View of Palliser Hotel on 9th Ave. Before 1929.

When the Canadian Pacific Railway (CPR) pushed west in 1883, Calgary was essentially a North-West Mounted Police post and trading centre. With an influx of tourists, mainly en route to CPR's Banff Springs Hotel, a hospitality spot in Calgary was an essential link.

To encourage the CPR to build the hotel, Calgary City Council offered an exemption on property from taxation, but the CPR would be subject to additional police and fire protection fees, and pave part of 9th Avenue. Groundbreaking for the building was on May 12, 1911, on property owned by the CPR. It was built by P. Lyall and Sons Construction Company with materials such as stone, steel, reinforced concrete and brick at a cost of $1,500,000.

The Palliser Hotel opened without any pomp or ceremony on June 1, 1914. The hotel's first registered guest was Charles Walsh Rowley, a banker from Winnipeg who previously lived in Calgary. Like some other flagship Canadian hotels in the Fairmont chain, it was built by the CPR and was a property of Canadian Pacific Hotels and Resorts (CP Hotels) until the company purchased the Fairmont Hotel chain and changed its name to Fairmont Hotels and Resorts in 1999.

The hotel was named after Captain John Palliser, who was an explorer in the region during the 1850s. Architect Lawrence Gotch of E. and W.S. Maxwell of Montreal designed the Edwardian building with a characteristic Chicago school look. The building when completed in 1914 was eight stories in height and included a sun parlour, with four additional floors added in 1929 to keep pace with the growing city. The hotel expanded from 190 staff when opened in 1914 to 375 in 1929.

Upon the addition of four stories in 1929, the Palliser Hotel became the tallest building in Calgary, a title it retained until Elveden Centre eclipsed the Palliser in 1958.

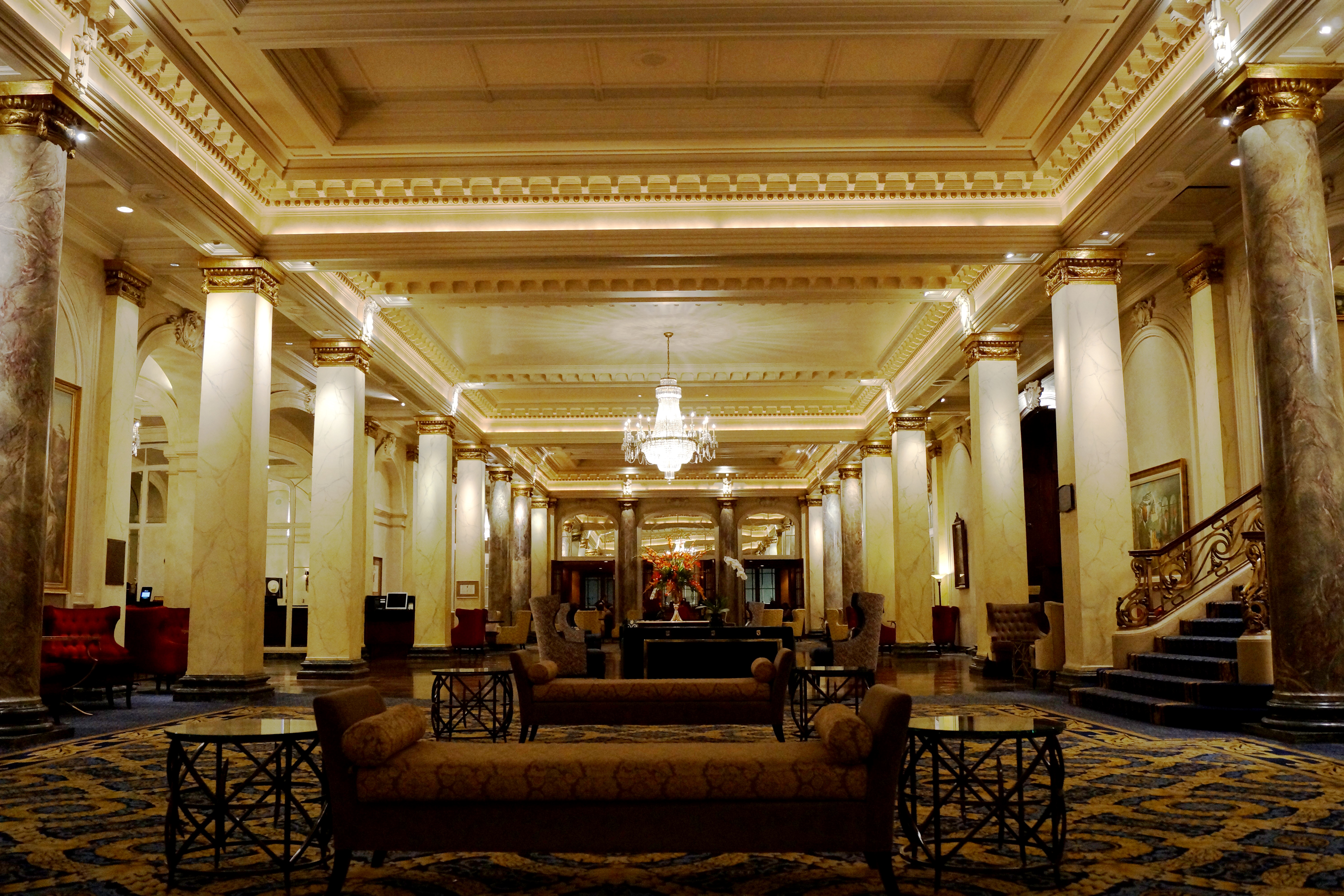
Lobby, 2015.

The Palliser Hotel has been renovated and expanded a number of times throughout its history, including a $28 million renovation in 2000. Further enhancements and renovations included an update to Fairmont Gold and many guest rooms.

The Palliser and the Hotel Macdonald in Edmonton received the first two liquor licences from the Alberta Liquor Control Board when Alberta repealed Prohibition in 1924. The Palliser Hotel's tavern was the last male-only bar room in Calgary, finally allowing women in 1970.

Former Prime Minister of Canada R. B. Bennett lived in this hotel for some years.

== See also ==
- Canada's grand railway hotels
