= Chateau Lacombe Hotel =

Hotel in Edmonton, Alberta, Canada

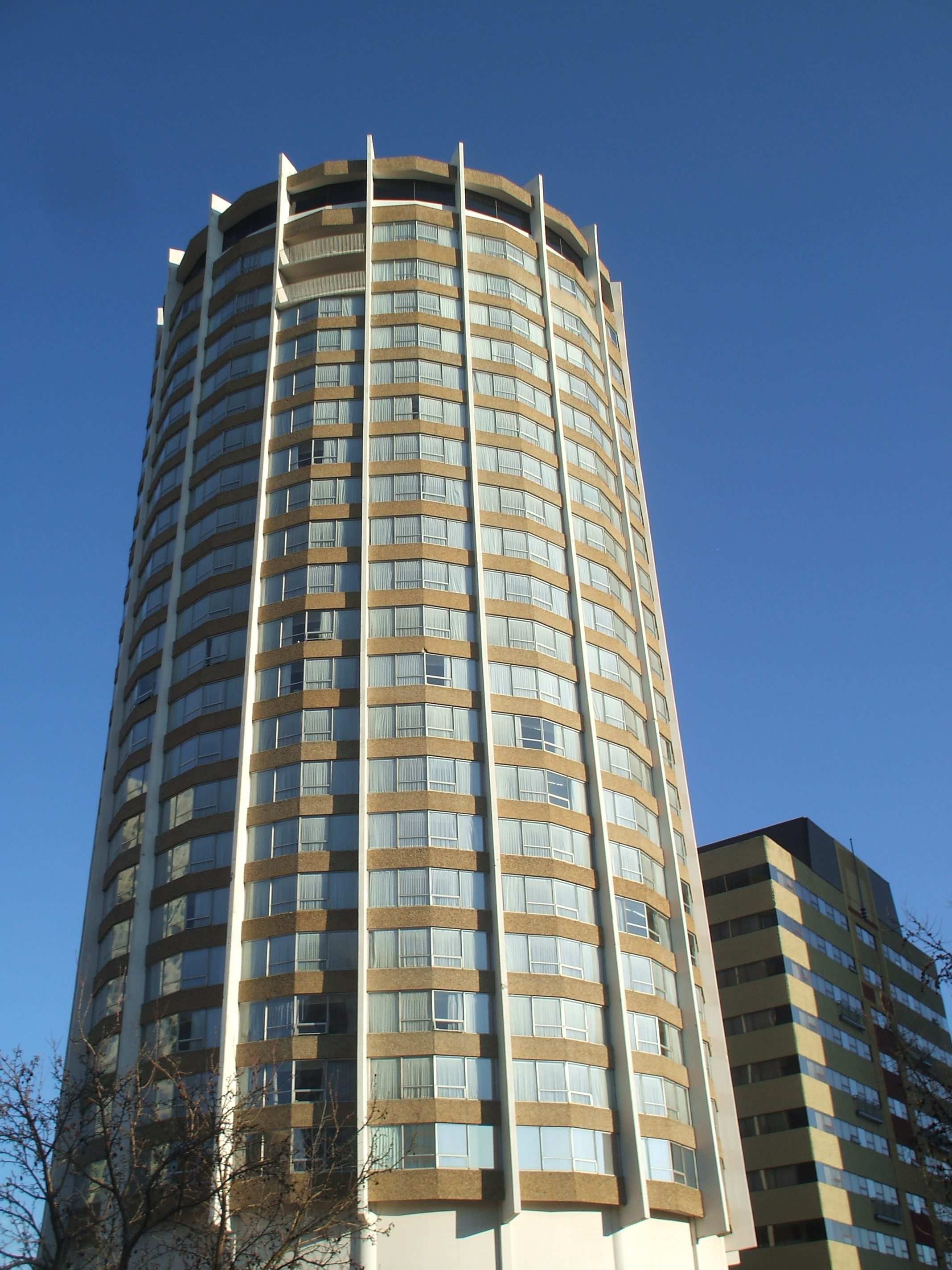
- Interactive map of the Chateau Lacombe Hotel area

General information
- Location: 10111 Bellamy Hill; Edmonton, Alberta; T5J 1N7
- Coordinates: 53°32′20.72″N 113°29′39.89″W
- Opening: 1966

Technical details
- Floor count: 24

Other information
- Number of rooms: 307

Website
- www.chateaulacombe.com

The Chateau Lacombe is a hotel in Edmonton, Alberta, Canada.

== Description ==
One of Edmonton's major hotels located in downtown Edmonton, the Chateau Lacombe was first opened on 28 December 1966 by the Canadian Pacific Hotels Corporation (CPH). It features 307 rooms in the 24-storey cylindrical tower topped by Edmonton's only revolving restaurant, La Ronde, which offers sweeping views of both the city's downtown core and the North Saskatchewan River valley below as it makes a full rotation every 90 minutes.

In 1988, CPH bought the Canadian National Hotels chain, which included the nearby Hotel Macdonald. In 1991, the newer Chateau Lacombe was rebranded the Holiday Inn Crowne Plaza, though complemented by the original name initially. In 1995, the hotel was renamed the Crowne Plaza Edmonton Chateau Lacombe.

It was sold again in mid-2010 for $47.8m to local company Hargate Properties who retained the affiliation with Crowne Plaza Hotels but the new owners went into receivership in November 2011. The purchase of the hotel by Kevyn Frederick in 2010 later was discovered to be part of a large mortgage fraud in the Edmonton area.

The hotel was bought out of receivership by the new ownership group for $27.5m in 2012, and in May 2013 the hotel was relaunched as an independent hotel.

== Name ==
The hotel is named after Father Albert Lacombe, an Oblate missionary and pioneer priest instrumental in the foundation and settlement of Alberta in the late 1800s.
