= Canadian Pacific Hotels =

Canadian hotel subsidiary (1963–1998)

Canadian Pacific Hotels (CPH) was a division of the Canadian Pacific Railway (CPR) that primarily operated hotels across Canada, since passenger revenue made a significant contribution to early railway profitability. CPR restructured the division as a subsidiary in 1963. In 1988, CPR purchased the Canadian National Hotels chain, making Canadian Pacific Hotels and Resorts the nation's largest hotel owner. In 1998, all CPH properties were branded as either Fairmont or Delta.

In 2006, Kingdom Hotels International and Colony Capital purchased Fairmont, consolidating their hotel brands to form Fairmont Raffles Hotels International (FRHI), which in turn became a subsidiary of AccorHotels in 2016. In 2007, BC Investment Management Corp. bought Delta Hotels, which was purchased by Marriott International in 2015.

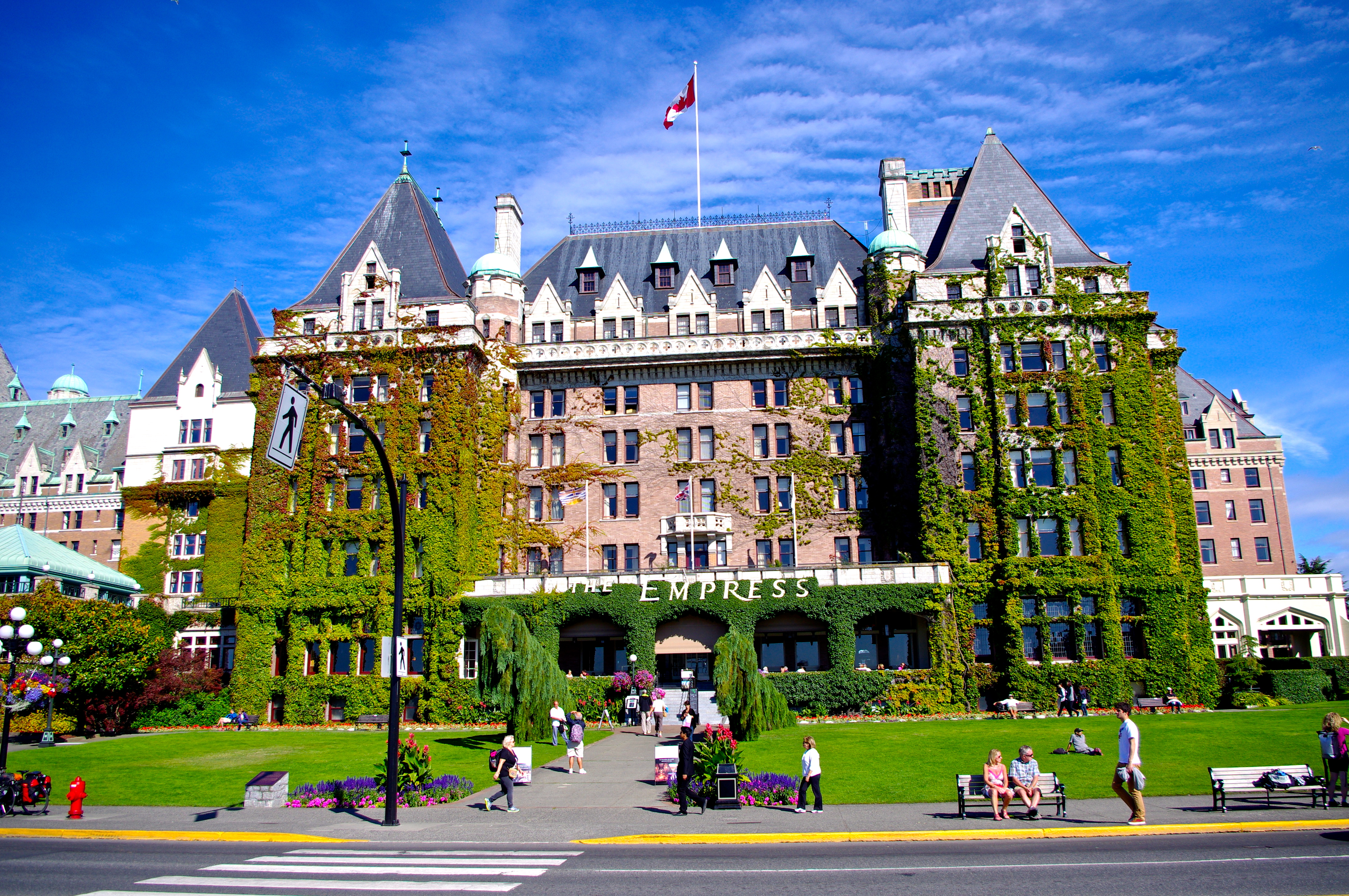
Empress Hotel, Victoria, British Columbia, 2013

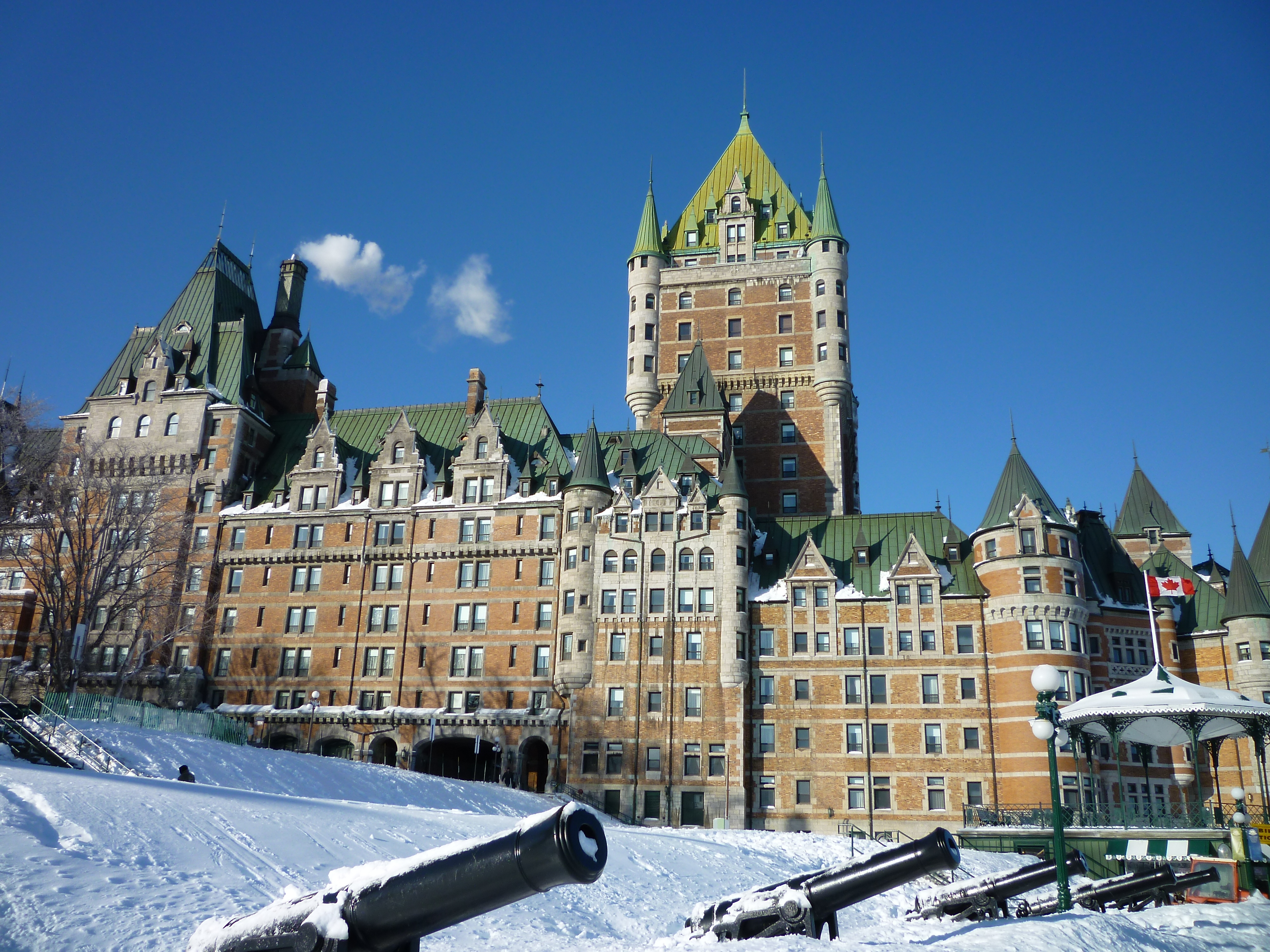
Château Frontenac, Quebec City, Quebec, 2009

== Early hotels ==
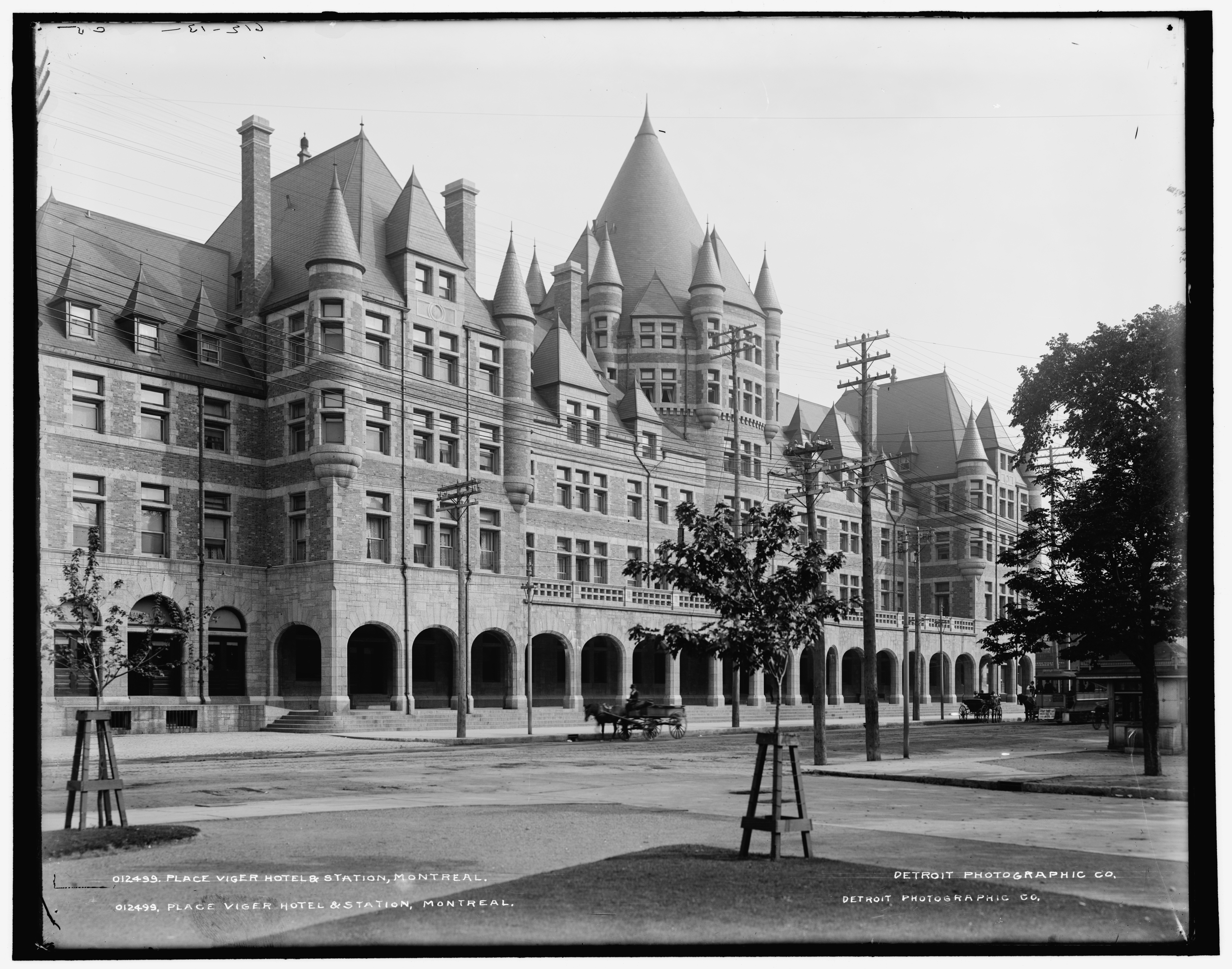
Place Viger Hotel & station, Montreal, c. 1900

Passenger revenue made a significant contribution to railway profitability, so facilities such as hotels were essential for attracting passenger traffic. The three earliest locations were Mount Stephen House, Glacier House, and North Bend. These initially were only dining stops, necessary because steep railway grades made hauling a dining car uneconomical. Thomas Sorby's design for these three hotels was inspired by Swiss chalets.

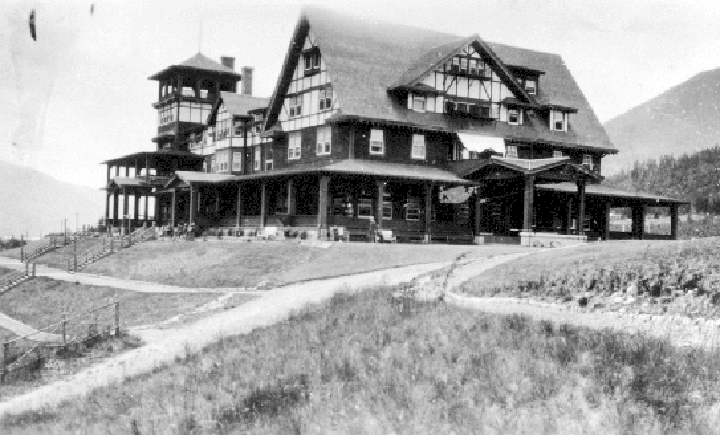
Former CP hotel, Balfour, British Columbia, 1918

Hotels were established mainly at locations which connected with other passenger rail or ferry routes, but some rural locations became tourist destinations in their own right, especially in the Canadian Rockies and Selkirk Mountains. The original Banff Springs Hotel was described as a "Tudor chalet in wood", and its success prompted CPR to lobby the government to create Banff National Park, the first in Canada. National parks protected CPH's commercial interests in such localities. The opportunity to participate in mountaineering excursions led by professional Swiss guides featured in CPH's promotion of the accommodation. Scenic images, often including a hotel, illustrated the CPH publicity brochures.

Urban and township land sales financed the construction of the early hotels. In the late 19th and early 20th centuries, CPH commonly adopted a châteauesque architectural style for building or enlarging significant hotels. The earliest example was Château Frontenac. Notable features included steeply pitched copper roofs, blue-green from oxidation, ornate gables, dormer windows, and irregularly placed towers and turrets.

The visual appeal of this design prompted other railway companies to imitate it. CPR and its later competitors Canadian Northern Railway and Grand Trunk Pacific Railway (which became part of Canadian National Railway (CN)) built Canada's grand railway hotels in every major Canadian city. However, CPR quickly reverted to a simpler style with a flat roof and limited ornamental features when designing most city hotels.

With growing automobile traffic and tourists seeking cheaper accommodation, CPH retained only the more profitable urban and destination hotels. The resort hotels opened only in summer. Year-round opening began in 1969 for Banff Springs Hotel, and in 1974 for Chateau Lake Louise.

CPR restructured the division as a subsidiary in 1963.

== Bungalow camps and tea houses ==
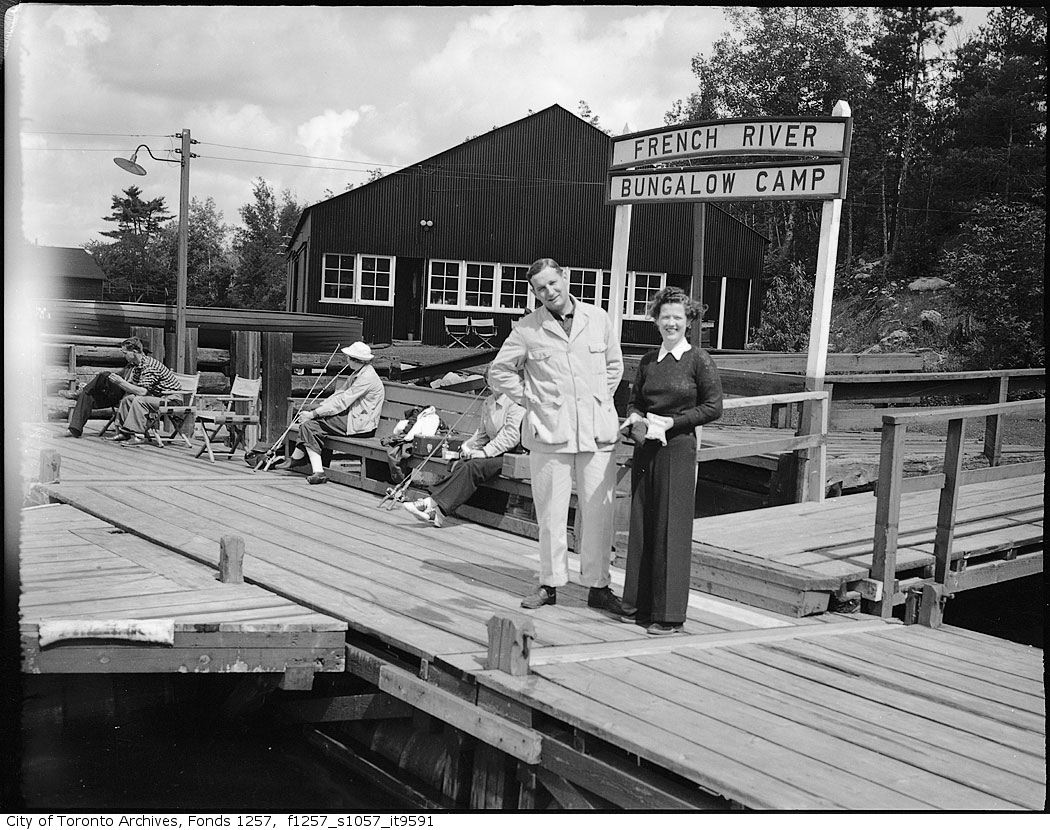
French River Bungalow Camp, Ontario, c. 1945

Each bungalow camp consisted of a group of cabins with a communal lodge set in a relatively remote forest area, reached by hiking or horseback. They initially catered to an elite type of tourist, mainly American, but they gradually attracted a broader audience. The log cabin at Lake Louise, Alberta (1891–1893), was a forerunner to this concept. The subsequent adoption of the log design created a pioneer appearance, but also provided the necessary insulation for a cold mountainous region. CN copied the concept at Jasper Park Lodge. Despite the rustic cabin exteriors, the interiors contained the modern comforts of the period. They were presented as more adventurous than a hotel stay, yet it was scarcely roughing it.

The CPH rest structures and teahouses at scenic locations along nearby trails similarly adopted a rustic design. Teahouses existed at Summit Lake, Twin Falls, Natural Bridge, Lake Agnes, and the Plain of Six Glaciers. Most rest houses were one-storey cabins at lower elevations.

CPH initially encouraged automobile travel by building camps along the Banff–Windermere Highway which opened in 1923. Automobile vacationers switched to inexpensive campgrounds in the 1930s, and CPH disposed of the least profitable bungalow camps, followed by the remainder in the 1950s.

== Later hotels ==
After a 24-year break in building or acquiring properties, CPH constructed a series of hotels and motels between 1955 and 1999. The larger ones mostly adopted the "Chateau" prefix. The company operated several international properties before it exited that market.

== Chains acquired ==
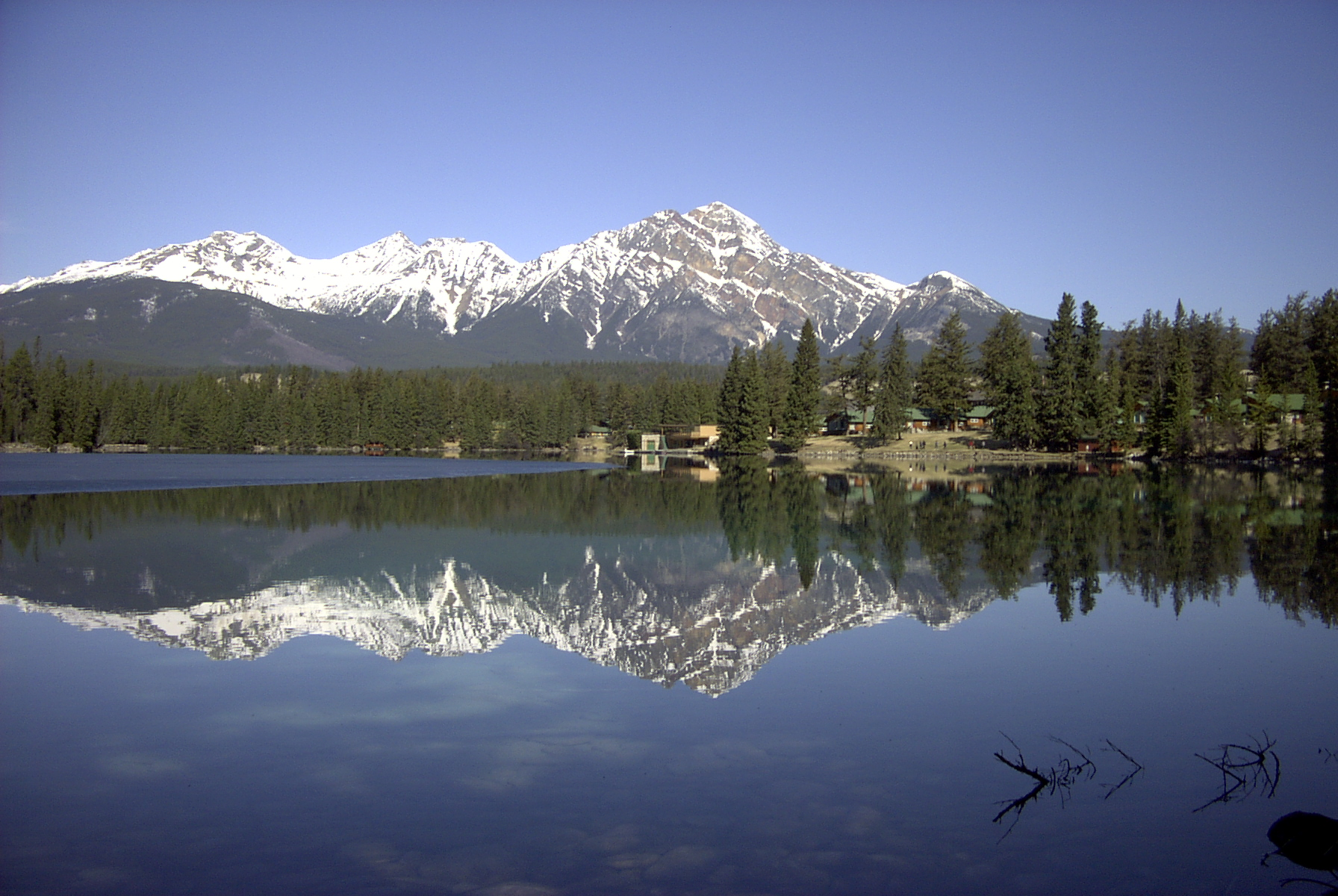
Jasper Park Lodge on Lac Beauvert, Jasper, Alberta, 2005

In 1988, CPR purchased the Canadian National Hotels chain, making Canadian Pacific Hotels and Resorts the nation's largest hotel owner. In 1998, CPR purchased the Canadian Delta Hotels chain and the international Princess Hotels chain. The following year, San Francisco-based Fairmont Hotels and Resorts chain was acquired. Minority shareholders were Kingdom Hotels (USA) Ltd. and Maritz Wolff & Co, each holding a 16.5 per cent interest. All CPH properties were branded as either Fairmont or Delta. In 2001, CPH was renamed Fairmont Hotels and Resorts. Later that year, Canadian Pacific Limited spun off all of its subsidiaries into separately traded companies, which included Fairmont Hotels and Resorts.

In 2006, Kingdom Hotels International and Colony Capital, which also owned the Raffles and Swissôtel chains, bought Fairmont. The following year, BC Investment Management Corp. bought Delta Hotels. In 2015, AccorHotels acquired a controlling interest in FRHI, adding the Fairmont, Raffles, and Swissôtel chains to its Luxury Hotel Brands portfolio. That year Marriott International bought the Delta chain.

== Canadian portfolio ==
=== Once under CP brand ===
==== Bungalow camps ====
Name	Opened	Locality		Disposals/Redevelopment
Emerald Lake Bungalow	1901	Emerald Lake	BC	1959 beginning of several lessee changes; 1979 Pat & Connie; O'Connor acquired. Fairmont appears to still hold crown lease.
Moraine Lake Bungalow	1913	Moraine Lake	AB	1930s sold.
Lake O'Hara Bungalow	1920	Lake O'Hara	BC	1954 Brewster-Ford Mountain Lodges; lodge still operates; Fairmont appears to still hold crown lease.
Lake Windermere Bnglw.	1920	Lk. Windermere	BC	1929 sublease for girls' camp. Subdivided and sold for residential properties in 1965. Lodge building relocated in 2010 and is now an events space.
Wapta Lake Bungalow	1921	Wapta Lake	BC	1954 subleased;
Storm (Castle) Mtn. Bnglw.	1922	Storm Mountain	BC	1930s subleased; Storm Mountain Lodge.
Yoho Valley Bungalow	1922	Yoho Nat. Park	BC	1954 subleased; The Whiskey Jack Hostel is the only surviving building.
Radium (Sinclair) Hot; Springs Bungalow	1923	Radium	BC	1948 subleased to Addison; 2001 Addison's Bungalow Camp relocated.
Vermilion River Bungalow	1923	Vermilion River	BC	1929 closed; 1932 subleased to Victor H. Lord, who revived it; now known as Kootenay Park Lodge; several subsequent sublessees.
Devil's Gap Bungalow	1923	Kenora	ON	1961 sold to Austin H. Ford; 2008 abandoned; 2019 partially destroyed by fire.
Nipigon River Bungalow	1923	Nipigon	ON	1935 sold to Don Gapen, who ran as Chalet Lodge for several decades; 2018 Red Rock First Nation, refurbished and reopened.
French River Bungalow	1923	French River	ON	1945 sold to Clarence Honey; 1965 beginning of several ownership changes; 1988–92 major renovations followed by 3 owners; now French River Lodge.

==== Hotels ====
Name	Opened	Locality		From chain/owner		CP Hotels	1999 rename	Disposals/Redevelopment
Grand Hotel	c.1875	Caledonia; Springs	ON	1905	unknown	Grand Hotel		1915 closed; 1920 demolished.
Mount Stephen House	1886; 1902 (extn)	Field	BC		N/A	Mount Stephen; House		1918 YMCA hostel; 1954 largely demolished; 1963 remainder demolished.
Glacier House	1887 multi (extn)	Glacier	BC		N/A	Glacier House		1925 closed; 1929 demolished.
Fraser Canyon House	1887 (1st); 1928 (2nd)	North Bend	BC		N/A	N. Bend Hotel		1927 fire destroyed; 1929 rebuilt; 1941 closed; 1978 demolish.
Hotel Vancouver (1st)	1888	Vancouver	BC		N/A	Hotel Vancouver		1915 demolished after main section of new hotel completed.
Banff Springs Hotel	1888 (1st); 1914 (extn); 1928 (extn)	Banff	AB		N/A	Banff Springs; Hotel	The Fairmont; Banff Springs	1926 fire destroyed wooden 1888 building, leaving only 1914 concrete wing.
The Algonquin Resort	1889 (1st) multi (extn); 1914 (2nd) multi (extn)	St. Andrews	NB	1905	St. Andrews; Land Co.	The; Algonquin; Resort	The Fairmont; Algonquin.	1914 fire destroyed 1889 building; 2012 sold; 2013 Marriott; Autograph Collection.
Cornwallis Hotel	1892 (1st); 1930 (2nd)	Kentville	NS	1911	Dominion; Atlantic acquired	Cornwallis Inn		1963 Franklin brothers; 1976 closed; Don Wallace appt/off. conversion.
Château Frontenac	1893; 1924 (extn)	Quebec City	QC		N/A	Château; Frontenac	Fairmont; Le Château; Frontenac.	
Chateau Lake Louise	1894 (1st) multi (extn); 1912 (extn) multi (extn)	Banff	AB		N/A	Chateau; Lake Louise	Fairmont; Chateau; Lake Louise.	1924 fire destroyed wooden building, leaving only 1912 concrete wing.
Hotel Revelstoke	1897	Revelstoke	BC		N/A	Hotel; Revelstoke		1927 closed, 1928 dismantled.
Place Viger Hotel/Stn.	1898	Montreal	QC		N/A	Place Viger; Hotel/Stn.		1935 closed & disused; 2020 under redevelopment.
Manoir Richelieu	1899 (1st); 1929 (2nd)	La Malbaie	QC	1998	Ray; Malenfant	Manoir; Richelieu	Fairmont; Le Manoir; Richelieu.	1928 fire destroyed 1899 building.
Hotel Sicamous	1900	Sicamous	BC		N/A	Hotel Sicamous		1932 leased out; 1956 closed; 1964 demolished.
private residence	c.1900	St. Andrews	NB	1907	Henry; Osburn	The Inn		1919 land swap with town; 1937 destroyed.
Station Hotel	1901	McAdam	NB		N/A	McAdam; Hotel/Stn.		1959 closed; now museum.
The Pines, Digby	1903 (1st); 1929 (2nd)	Digby	NS	1917	Harry B. Churchill	The Pines, Digby		1928 closed 1903 building; 1965 Nova Scotia government property; 2001 NS Signature property.
Royal Alexandra Hotel	1906	Winnipeg	MB		N/A	Royal; Alexandra		1967 closed; 1971 demolished.
The Empress (hotel)	1908 multi (extn)	Victoria	BC		N/A	The; Empress	The Fairmont; Empress.	
Kootenay Lake Hotel	1911	Balfour	BC		N/A	Kootenay; Lake Hotel		c.1915 closed; 1917 sanitorium; 1929 destroyed.
Château Laurier	1912 multi (extn)	Ottawa	ON	1988	Canadian; National	Château; Laurier	Fairmont; Chât. Laurier.	
Cameron Lake; Chalet/Station	1912	Cameron; Lake	BC		N/A	Cameron Lake; Chalet		1966 closed; 1970 demolished.
Incola Hotel (or) Hotel Incola	1912	Penticton	BC		N/A	Incola Hotel (or) Hotel Incola		1942 leased to local syndicate; 1950 sold to Hencott Houses; 1959 sold to Jack C. Young; 1966–1975 multiple owners; 1979 closed; 1981 demolished.
Palliser Hotel	1914; 1929 (extn)	Calgary	AB		N/A	Palliser; Hotel	The Fairmont; Palliser.	
Hotel Macdonald	1915; 1953 (extn)	Edmonton	AB	1988	Canadian; National	Hotel; Macdonald	Fairmont Hotel; Macdonald.	1983 demolition of 1953 extension.
Hotel Vancouver (2nd)	1916	Vancouver	BC		N/A	Hotel Vancouver		1939 repurposed as World War II barracks; 1946 veteran housing; 1948 vacated; 1949 demolished.
Jasper Park Lodge cabins first; main lodge 1923; more buildings, replace main lodge 1953; more buildings.	1922; 1923 (1st); 1953 (2nd)	Jasper	AB	1988	Canadian; National	Jasper Park; Lodge	Fairmont; Jasper Park; Lodge.	1952 fire destroyed 1923 lodge.
Newfoundland Hotel	1926 (1st); 1982 (2nd)	St. John's	NL	1988	Canadian; National	Hotel; Newfoundland	The Fairmont; Newfoundland.	2009 Sheraton Newfoundland.
Hotel Saskatchewan	1927	Regina	SK		N/A	Hotel; Saskatchewan		1980 onwards various operators; 1993 Radisson property; 2015 Marriott; Autograph Collection.
Lord Nelson Hotel	1928 multi (extn)	Halifax	NS		N/A	Lord Nelson; Hotel		1947 sold to local interests.
Royal York Hotel	1929; 1959 (extn)	Toronto	ON		N/A	Royal York; Hotel	The Fairmont; Royal York.	
Château Montebello	1930	Montebello	QC		N/A	Château; Montebello	Fairmont; Le Château; Montebello.	1930 leased by Seigniory Club; 1970 CP resumed operation.
Lakeside Inn	1931	Yarmouth	NS		N/A	Lakeside Inn		1960 sold to be nursing home.
Hotel Vancouver (3rd)	1939	Vancouver	BC	1988	Canadian; National	Hotel; Vancouver	Fairmont Hotel; Vancouver.	
Timberline Hotel	1955	Banff	AB	1963	Timberline; Hotel Ltd.	Timberline Hotel		1966 terminated lease; 2005 renamed the Juniper Hotel by Decore Hotels.
The Queen Elizabeth; Hotel	1958	Montreal	QC	1988	Canadian; National	Queen; Elizabeth; Hotel	Fairmont; The Queen; Elizabeth.	
Chateau Lacombe Hotel	1966	Edmonton	AB		N/A	Chateau; Lacombe Hotel		1991 Holiday Inn Crowne Plaza; 1995 Crowne Plaza Chateau; Lacombe; 2013 independent.
Château Champlain	1967	Montreal	QC		N/A	Château; Champlain		1995 Montreal Marriott; Château Champlain.
Winnipeg Inn then Westin Hotel Winnipeg	1970	Winnipeg	MB	1998	Westin; Hotels	The Lombard	The Fairmont; Wpg.	
Le Baron Hotel	1970	Trois-Rivières	QC		N/A	Le Baron		Choice Hotel Urbania; c.2012 rename Rodeway Inn.
Northstar Inn	1971	Winnipeg	MB		N/A	Northstar Inn		1983 Delta; 1998 Radisson.
Red Oak Inn	1972	Brandon	MB		N/A	Red Oak Inn		c.1982 Royal Oak Inn; 1990 Genesis acquired; 2017 Choice Clarion; Hotel & Suites.
Hotel Beauséjour	1972	Moncton	NB	1988	Canadian; National	Hotel; Beauséjour	Delta (Note: Marriott prefix added to name after 2015 acquisition); Beauséjour.	
Chateau Halifax	1973	Halifax	NS		N/A	Chateau Halifax	Delta Halifax.	2019 SilverBirch Hotel Halifax
Red Oak Inn	1974	Thunder Bay	ON		N/A	Red Oak Inn		1993 Victoria Inn Hotel & Convention Centre
Red Oak Inn	1974	Peterborough	ON		N/A	Red Oak Inn		1998 Princess Gardens seniors residence.
Le Château de l'Aéroport	1977	Mirabel	QC		N/A	Le Château de l'Aéroport		2002 hotel abandoned; 2004 airport abandoned.
Chateau Calgary; Airport	1979	Calgary	AB		N/A	Chateau; Calgary Apt.	Delta Calg. Apt; In-Terminal.	
Prince Edward Hotel	1982	Charlottetown	PE		N/A	Prince Edward; Hotel	Delta Prince; Edward.	
Sheraton Toronto East	1982	Scarborough	ON	1998	Sheraton		Delta; Toronto E.	
L'Hôtel	1984	Downtown; Toronto	ON	1988	Canadian; National	L'Hôtel		1993 InterContinental Crowne; Plaza Toronto Centre; 2003 rename InterContinental; Toronto Centre.
Hotel/Lodge Kananaskis	1987	Kananaskis; Village	AB		N/A	Hotel/Lodge; Kananaskis	Delta Lodge at Kananaskis.	2015 Marriott Pomeroy; Kananaskis Mtn. Lodge.
Chateau Whistler	1989	Whistler	BC		N/A	Chateau; Whistler	The Fairmont; Chateau; Whistler.	
Skydome Hotel	1989	Downtown; Toronto	ON		N/A	Skydome Hotel		1999 Renaissance Toronto Dtn; 2017 rename Toronto Marriott City Centre Hotel.
Waterfront Centre	1991	Vancouver	BC		N/A	Waterfront; Centre	The Fairmont; Waterfront.	
Chateau Mt. Tremblant	1996	Mt-Tremblant	QC		N/A	Chateau Mt. Tremblant	Fairmont; Tremblant.	
Vancouver Airport Place	1999	Richmond	BC		N/A	Vancouver; Airport Place	The Fairmont; Vancouver Airport	

=== Once under Delta brand ===
(See Delta Hotels)

== US/international portfolio ==
=== Once under CP brand ===
==== Bahamas ====
- Balmoral Beach Hotel, Nassau, Bahamas – now Sandals Royal Bahamian Resort
- Lucayan Harbour Inn and Marina, Freeport, Bahamas, demolished to build Grand Bahama Yacht Club

==== Curaçao ====
- Curaçao Plaza, Willemstad – now Plaza Hotel Curaçao

==== Germany ====
- Bremen Plaza, Bremen, Germany, leased/operated 1985–1989 – now Swissôtel Bremen
- Frankfurt Plaza, Frankfurt, Germany, leased/operated 1976–1989 – now Frankfurt Marriott
- Hamburg Plaza, Hamburg, Germany, leased/operated 1973–1988 – now Radisson Blu Hotel Hamburg

==== Israel ====
- Jerusalem Plaza, Jerusalem, operated 1970s–1980s – now Leonardo Plaza Hotel Jerusalem
- Tiberias Plaza, Tiberias, operated 1970s–1980s – now Leonardo Plaza Hotel Tiberias

==== Mexico ====
- Continental Hilton, Mexico City, D.F. – rebranded as Château Royal under CP Hotels ownership (1973–1980). Demolished after the 1985 earthquake.
- El Mirador Plaza, Acapulco, Guerrero – now Mirador Acapulco Hotel
- Club Akumal Caribe, Caribe, Quintana Roo – now Hotel Akumal Caribe

==== United States ====
- Franklin Plaza, Philadelphia, operated 1979–1984 – now Sheraton Philadelphia Downtown

=== Acquired Fairmont properties ===
Name	Opened	Locality	Disposals/Redevelopment
The Fairmont New Orleans	1893	Downtown New Orleans, Louisiana	2005 closed; 2007 sold; 2009 reopened by Waldorf Astoria as The Roosevelt New Orleans
Fairmont San Francisco	1907	San Francisco, Northern California	
The Plaza	1907	Midtown Manhattan, New York City	
Fairmont Copley Plaza	1912	Downtown Boston, Massachusetts	
The Fairmont Dallas	1969	Downtown Dallas, Texas	
Fairmont Chicago	1987	Chicago, Illinois	
The Fairmont San Jose	1987	Downtown San Jose, Southern California	closed 2021, reopened as Signia by Hilton San Jose in 2022

=== Acquired Princess properties ===
Name	Opened	Locality	1999 rename	Disposals/Redevelopment
The Hamilton Princess	1884	Pembroke, Bermuda	The Fairmont; Hamilton Princess	
Pierre Marques	1958	Acapulco, Mexico	The Fairmont; Pierre Marques	2015 independent: The Pierre Mundo Imperial
Acapulco Princess	1971	Acapulco, Mexico	The Fairmont; Acapulco Princess	2015 independent: The Princess Mundo Imperial
The Southampton Princess	1972	Southampton Parish, Bermuda	The Fairmont; Southampton	
Princess Glitter Bay	1981	Saint James, Barbados	The Fairmont; Glitter Bay	2004 sold; c.2006 converted to Royal Glitter Bay Villas.
Royal Pavilion	1987	Saint James, Barbados	The Fairmont; Royal Pavilion	
Scottsdale Princess	1987	Scottsdale, Arizona	The Fairmont; Scottsdale Princess	
