= Chateau Lake Louise =

Hotel in Banff, Alberta, Canada

Fairmont Chateau Lake Louise
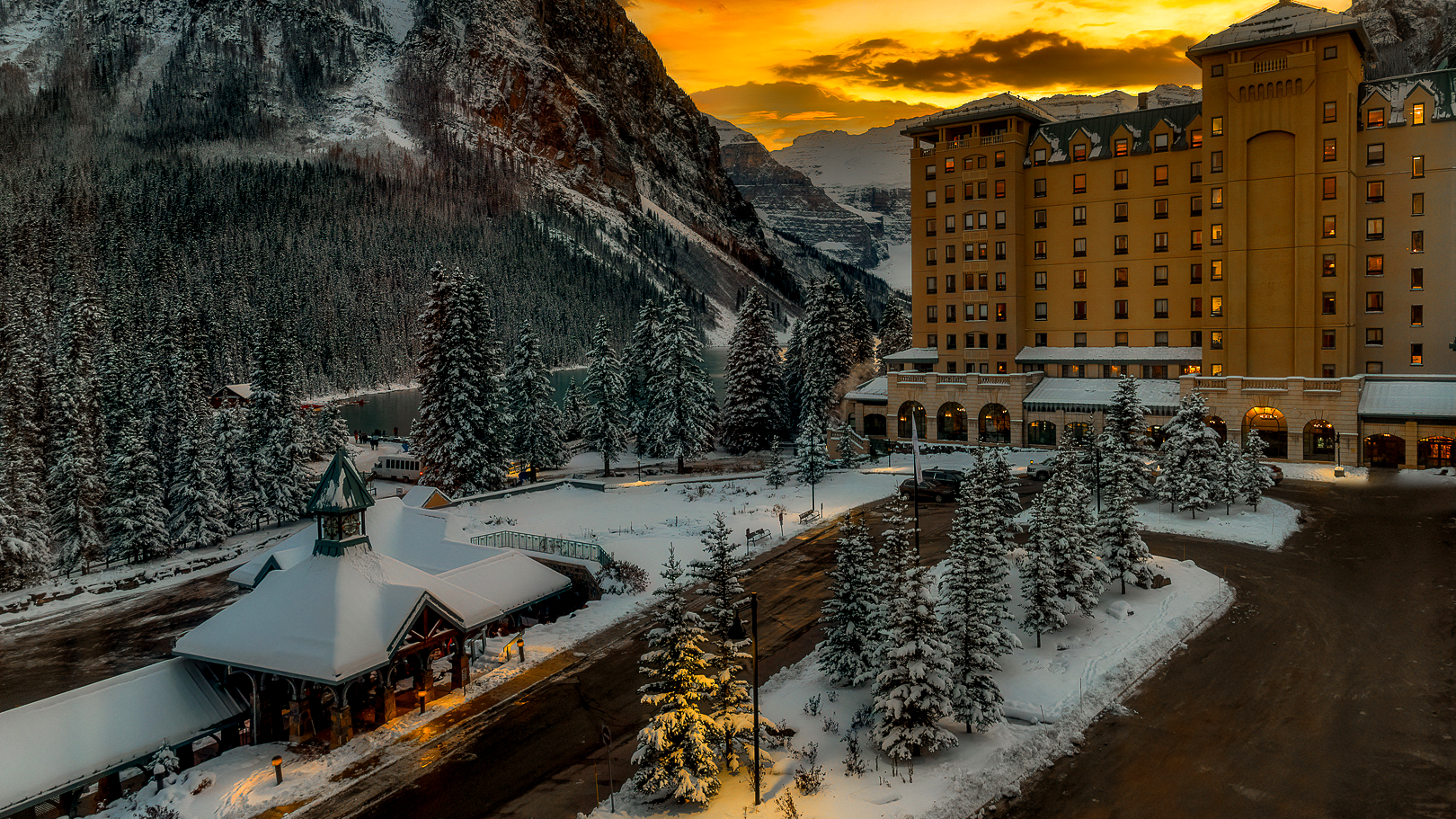
- Chateau Lake Louise in Alberta, Canada

- Location within Alberta

General information
- Location: 111 Lake Louise Drive, Lake Louise, Alberta, Canada
- Coordinates: 51°25′4″N 116°13′2″W
- Opening: 1890
- Owner: Oxford Properties
- Operator: Fairmont Hotels and Resorts

Technical details
- Floor count: 8

Other information
- Number of rooms: 539
- Number of restaurants: 7
- Parking: Paid parking or valet parking

Website
- www.chateau-lake-louise.com

The Fairmont Chateau Lake Louise is a Fairmont hotel on the eastern shore of Lake Louise, near Banff, Alberta. The original hotel was gradually developed at the turn of the 20th century by the Canadian Pacific Railway and was thus "kin" to its predecessors, the Banff Springs Hotel and the Château Frontenac. The original wooden Rattenbury Wing was destroyed by fire on July 3, 1924, and was replaced by the Barott Wing a year later. The Painter Wing, built in 1913, remains the oldest existing part of the hotel. The Mount Temple Wing, opened in 2004, is the most recent wing and features modern function facilities; these include the Mount Temple Ballroom.

== History ==
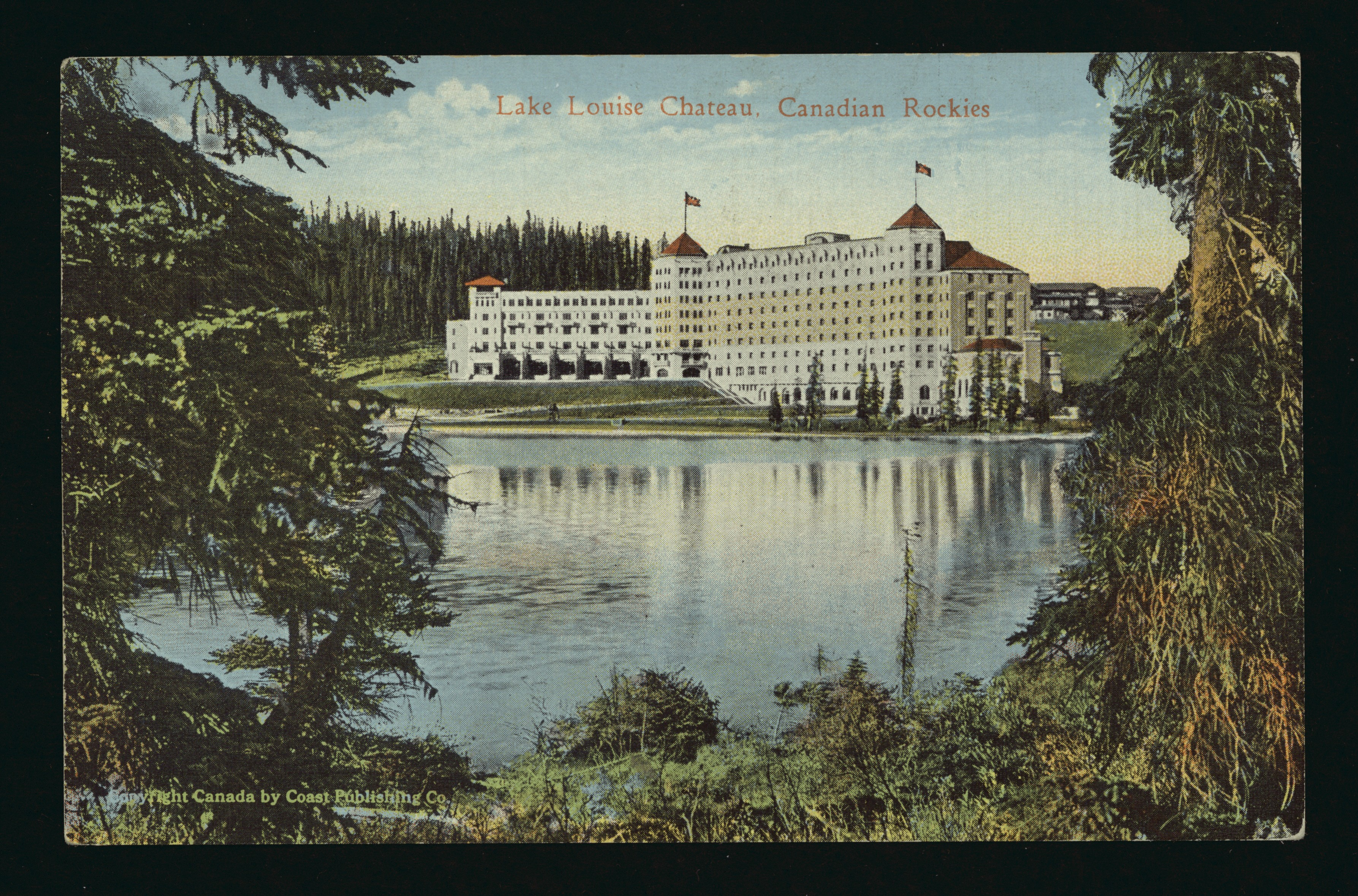
Chateau Lake Louise from across the lake in 1939

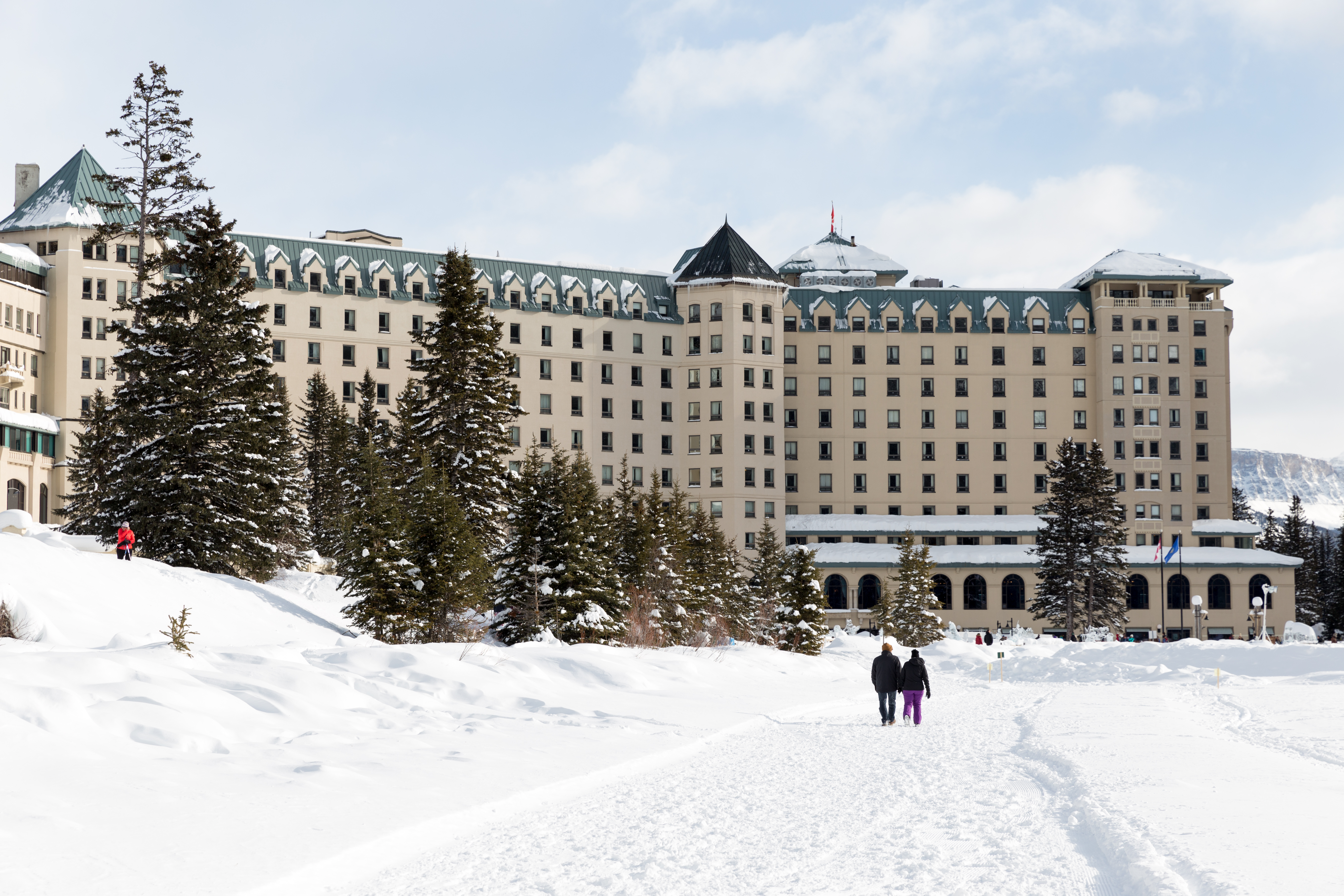

The hotel was first conceived by the railway at the end of the 19th century, as a vacation destination to lure moneyed travellers into taking trains and heading west. By the time airplanes and automobiles had displaced the trains, it had gained sufficient renown to have a life of its own. In 1999, Canadian Pacific Hotels (a division of the Canadian Pacific Railway) acquired Fairmont Hotels and Resorts, and adopted the Fairmont name for all of its hotels, resulting in the Chateau Lake Louise being operated as a Fairmont hotel.

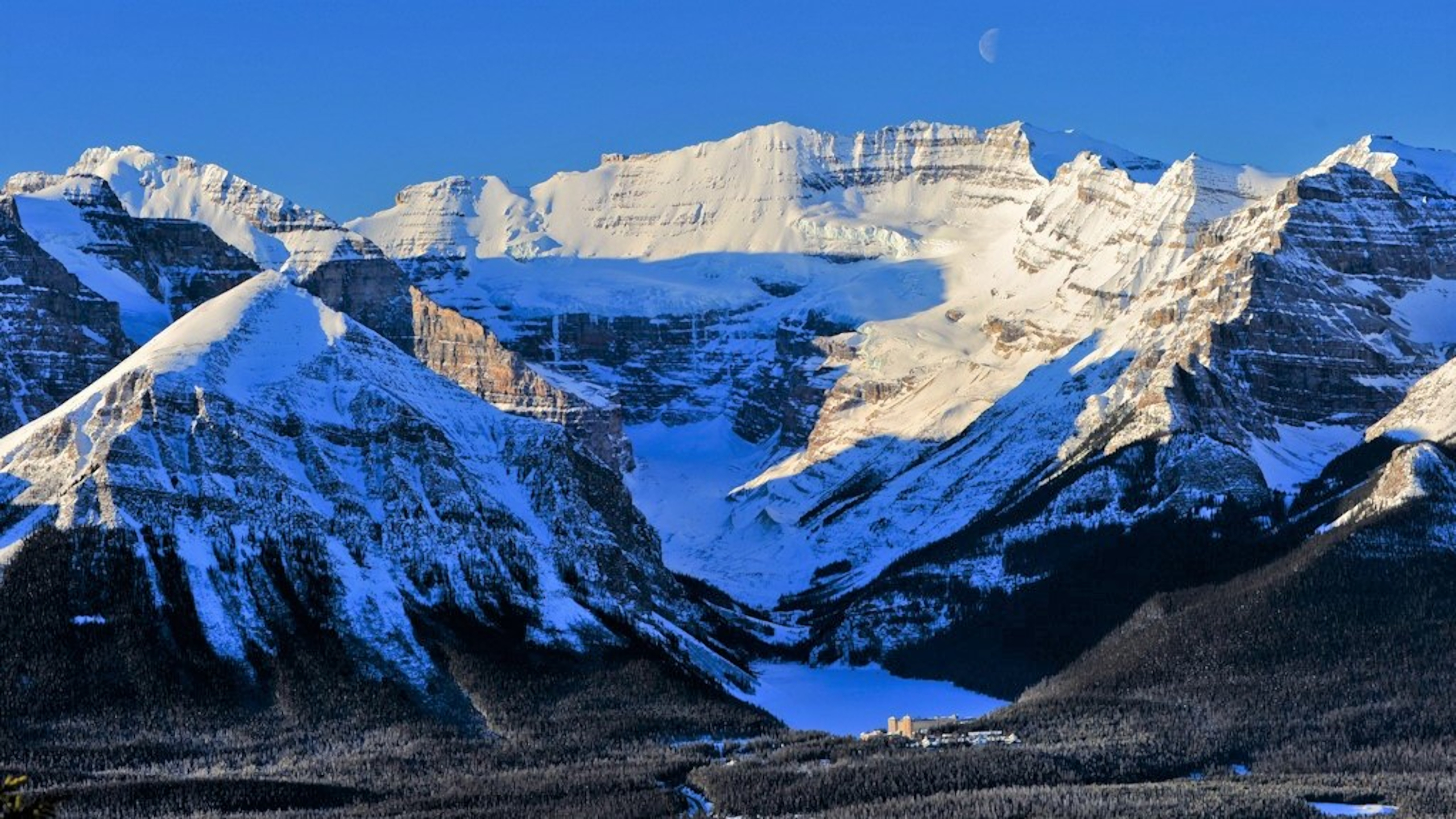
Lake Louise and Chateau from Ski Louise

The natural areas around the hotel were incorporated into Banff National Park, which has been declared a World Heritage Site by UNESCO.

Originally built to function only in summer, the hotel was winterized in 1982 and now offers all the regular ski resort fare during the winter months. In addition to the usual skiing, ice skating and snowboarding, there are sleigh rides, ice sculpture contests and snowshoe excursions.

The hotel is owned by Oxford Properties, the real estate arm of OMERS, and operated by Fairmont Hotels and Resorts of Toronto.

The hotel holds seven dining options: Fairview, Lakeview Lounge, the Walliser Stube, the Guide's Pantry (formerly the Chateau Deli), Louiza (formerly Poppy Brasserie), the Alpine Social (formerly the Glacier Saloon), and the seasonal Italian cuisine kitchen Lago (usually opened regularly during summer).
