= Chateau Aeroport-Mirabel =

Hotel in Quebec, Canada

Coordinates: 45.6841°N 74.0314°W

The former Le Château de l'Aéroport's indoor swimming pool and whirlpool in the atrium

Le Château de l'Aéroport is an abandoned resort themed hotel at the Mirabel International Airport in Mirabel, Quebec, Canada. It is located in the immediate vicinity of the airport's former passenger terminal building, and was connected to it via a skyway. It was left standing after the terminal's demolition until it was eventually also demolished in 2024. The hotel closed permanently in 2002.

== History ==
=== Early years ===
Tropical atrium with palm trees in the former Le Château de l'Aéroport. With guest rooms having a unique view of the interior surroundings

Construction on "Le Château de l'Aéroport" hotel began in June 1975, and was opened and operated by Canadian Pacific Hotels on December 3, 1977.

The property was developed along the same visual lines as other CP Hotels properties of the era, including the Chateau Airport Calgary and the Red Oak Inns of Thunder Bay and Peterborough. It had a large indoor atrium style foyer with fully grown palm trees, garden foliage, swimming pool and heated whirlpool; over which most rooms looked. It also had a glass elevator and terraced restaurant. High season was November to May. It accommodated passengers arriving and departing from the adjoining Mirabel Airport, with the 344 room and 11 suite complex located directly adjacent to the airport terminal and its above ground parking area.

=== Closure and abandonment ===
The hotel was a victim of the airport's decline. On August 26, 2002, facing high vacancies due to Mirabel Airport's dwindling usage, it closed after 25 years in service. Mirabel itself was eventually closed for passenger traffic in 2004.

A potential reopening was announced in February 2011, when Syscomax, a construction and management company, had signed a long term lease with Montreal Airport ADM to renovate and operate the long-vacant hotel. However, only renovations to the adjacent eight-storey administration building were completed (it planned for it to be used by aerospace companies; today it's mostly vacant office space for lease). Plans for a hotel reopening (first set for 2012, and then 2014) were repeatedly pushed back, until eventually canceled. Despite attempts to renovate the hotel, the extremely decayed state of the building made those efforts useless. By November 2014, Aeroports de Montreal announced a decision to demolish the adjacent airport terminal building and outdoor parking structure. Demolition work was completed in 2016, leaving just the hotel and its connecting skyway standing. The hotel has since been boarded up and left to deteriorate the past two decades. Extensive damage can be seen through its exterior windows, with ceilings partially collapsed due to water damage.
