= Fairmont Hotels & Resorts =

Canadian luxury hotel chain

- Type: Subsidiary
- Industry: Hospitality
- Predecessor: Canadian Pacific Hotels & Resorts; Fairmont Hotels Management
- Founded: 1886 (as Canadian Pacific Hotels); 2001 (as Fairmont Hotels & Resorts) (Note: The present company was formed in 2001, spun-off from Canadian Pacific Limited's hotel division.)
- Headquarters: New York City, United States
- Number of locations: 97 hotels (June 2026)
- Area served: Worldwide
- Services: Luxury hotels
- Parent: Accor
- Website: fairmont.com

Fairmont Hotels & Resorts is a Canadian chain of luxury hotels that operates more than 70 properties worldwide, with a strong presence in Canada.

The company originated from two hotel businesses established in the late 19th century, the Canadian Pacific Limited-owned Canadian Pacific Hotels & Resorts, and Fairmont Hotels. In 1999, Canadian Pacific Hotels acquired a majority interest in Fairmont Hotels; with Canadian Pacific Hotels later renaming its entire hotel portfolio under the Fairmont Hotels & Resorts banner in 2001. Shortly after the hotel division was renamed, Canadian Pacific Limited was split into several smaller companies in a starburst move, with Fairmont becoming a separately-traded company.

In 2006, Fairmont was acquired by Colony Capital, who subsequently entered into a joint partnership with the Kingdom Holding Company; consolidating Fairmont with their other hotel brands, Raffles and Swissôtel to form Fairmont Raffles Hotels International (FRHI). FRHI in turn became a subsidiary of Accor, then named AccorHotels, in 2016. Fairmont has since been part of Accor's Luxury & Lifestyle division, alongside Raffles, Orient Express, Sofitel and MGallery.

== History ==
=== Predecessors (1886–1999) ===
==== Canadian Pacific Hotels ====
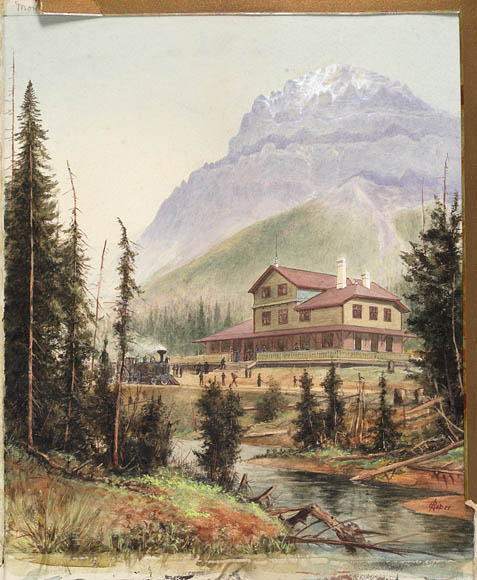
Mount Stephen House in 1887. Opened a year earlier, it was one of the first hotels operated by Canadian Pacific Hotels.

Canadian Pacific Hotels (CP Hotels) began as a division of the Canadian Pacific Railway (CPR) hotel department. The division operated a series of hotels along CPR's rail lines as early as 1886. Many of these resort hotels were built and operated by the railway's hotel department, while a few were later acquired from Canadian National Hotels, a hotel division of the Canadian National Railway. Over the years, a collection of grand railway hotels was assembled throughout Canada, in both rural and urban areas. By the 1980s, CP Hotels' collection included the Chateau Lake Louise, the Banff Springs Hotel, the Château Frontenac, the Empress Hotel, the Palliser Hotel, the Fairmont Royal York, and others. In addition to its properties in Canada, the hotel chain operated a few hotels outside Canada, with properties in Germany, Israel, Mexico, and the United States.

CPR's rival, the Grand Trunk Railway, and later the Canadian National Railway, copied Van Horne's approach by building hotels such as the Jasper Park Lodge in Jasper, Alberta, and the Château Laurier in Ottawa. CPR purchased Canadian National Hotels, the Canadian National Railway's hotel division, in 1988, making CP Hotels the nation's largest hotel owner. In the 1990s, CP Hotels expanded and purchased the Canadian Delta Hotels chain and the international Princess Hotels chain in 1998, which became wholly owned subsidiaries of CP Hotels. In 1999, CP Hotels purchased the San Francisco-based Fairmont Hotels & Resorts chain.

==== Fairmont Hotels ====
During the 1890s, James Graham Fair bought the land where the Fairmont San Francisco now stands, the first hotel to bear the Fairmont namesake. The nearly completed structure survived the earthquake of 1906. Although heavily damaged by the subsequent fires, the hotel was renovated under the eye of architect Julia Morgan and finally opened in 1907. In 1926, the Penthouse Suite was created with three secret passageways to access it.

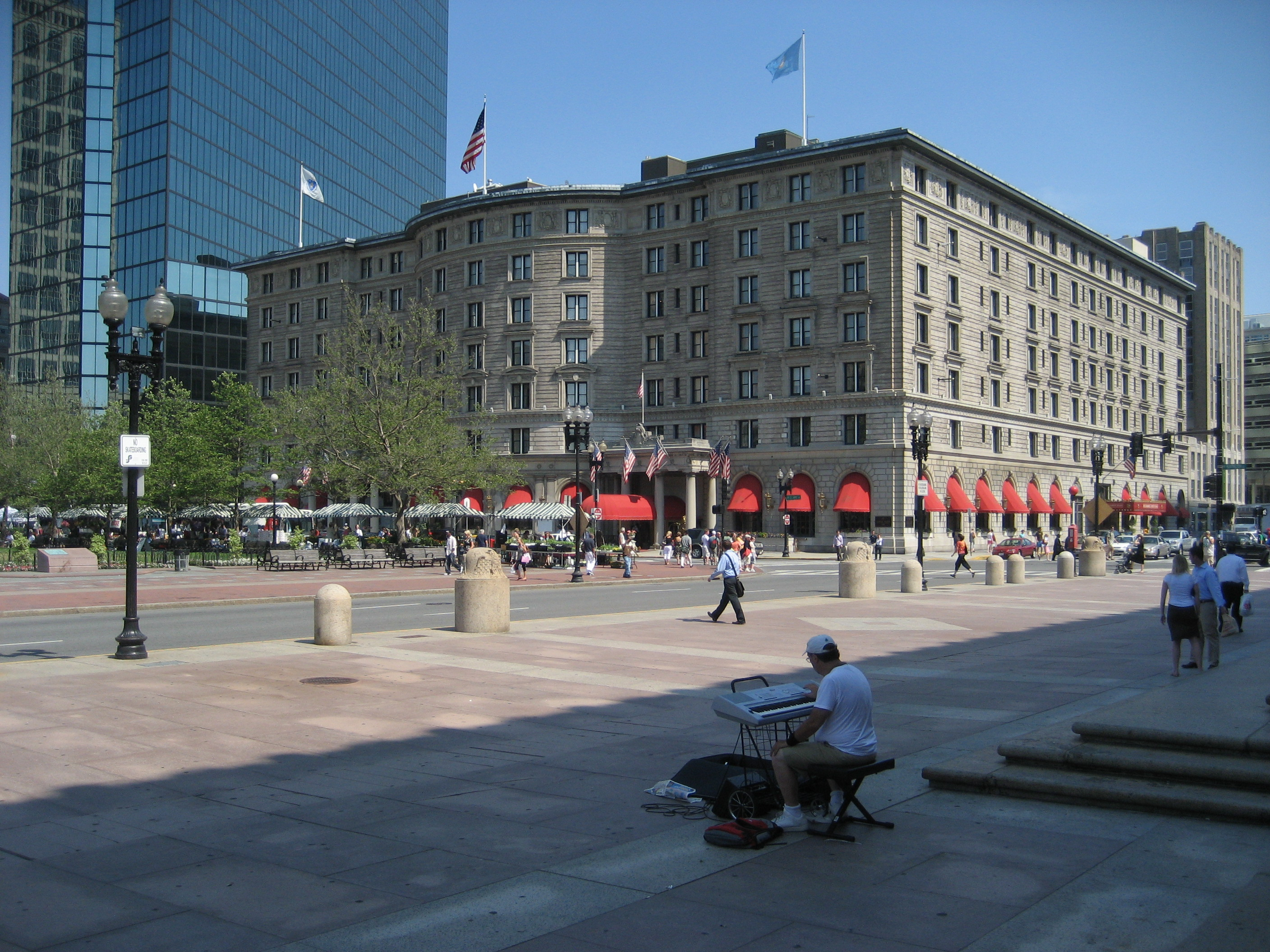
The Fairmont Copley Plaza Hotel is one of seven properties managed by Fairmont prior to being acquired by Canadian Pacific Hotels.

In 1945, the Fairmont San Francisco was acquired by Benjamin Swig. Beginning in the 1960s, the Swig family developed Fairmont into a small chain of luxury hotels throughout the United States. Operating as Fairmont Hotels Management, the hotel chain acquired, and built a number of hotel properties. The chain acquired the Roosevelt Hotel in New Orleans in 1965, renaming it the Fairmont Roosevelt, and then Fairmont New Orleans. The Fairmont San Jose was opened by the hotel chain in 1987. The company assumed management of the Plaza Hotel in New York in 1995 and purchased the Copley Plaza Hotel in 1996, renaming it The Fairmont Copley Plaza Hotel. By 1998, the company managed seven properties in the United States.

In addition to those properties, the company also operated the Colony Square Hotel in Atlanta as Fairmont Colony Square Hotel from its opening in 1974 to 1977, and The Bellevue-Stratford Hotel in Philadelphia as Fairmont Philadelphia from 1979 to 1980.

=== Merger (1999–2001) ===
In April 1999, Canadian Pacific Hotels, Kingdom Hotels International and Maritz Wolff & Co. bought Fairmont Hotels Management L.P., with Canadian Pacific Hotels holding the majority of the shares (67%).

In 2001, Canadian Pacific Limited, the parent company of both Canadian Pacific Hotels and Resorts, and Canadian Pacific Railway, was reorganized. During this reorganization, Canadian Pacific Hotels and Resorts was renamed to Fairmont Hotels & Resorts, using the name of the company it had purchased in 1999. The newly re-organized Fairmont company transferred several properties to its Delta Hotels subsidiary, although it retained most of the "signature" hotels and resorts under the new Fairmont banner.

Later that year in October 2001, Canadian Pacific Limited spun off all of its subsidiary companies into separately traded "independent" companies, including Fairmont Hotels and Resorts. Companies like Fairmont Hotels & Resorts were split into smaller companies in a 2001 "starburst" move designed to increase the valuations of its individual divisions.

=== Fairmont Hotels & Resorts (2001–present) ===
In the early 2000s, Fairmont multiplied its openings in the United States. In 2001, Fairmont introduced the Willow Stream Spa prototype, a $7 million 2-floor 8,000-square-foot spa located inside the Fairmont Empress Hotel. The signature spa brand was then implemented in many of Fairmont's locations. In July 2001, Fairmont Hotels signed a joint-venture with Sheikh Khalifa bin Zayed Al Nahyan for a minority-stake purchase and the management of a luxury 393-room hotel in Dubai. The Fairmont Dubai property was the first Fairmont branded hotel in the Middle East. In 2003, Fairmont introduced Fairmont Heritage Place, a chain of timeshare hotels, with the first opening in Mexico.

In 2004, Fairmont Hotels & Resorts Inc. paid $70 million to take full control of the management company that runs its properties. Then in early 2006, a cluster of Fairmont Hotels & Resorts was sold for US$3.9 billion to Colony Capital, LLC. As a result of that purchase, Fairmont Hotels & Resorts was united with Raffles Hotels and Resorts and Swissôtel to form Fairmont Raffles Hotels International (FRHI), though the four chains still operate under their individual names.

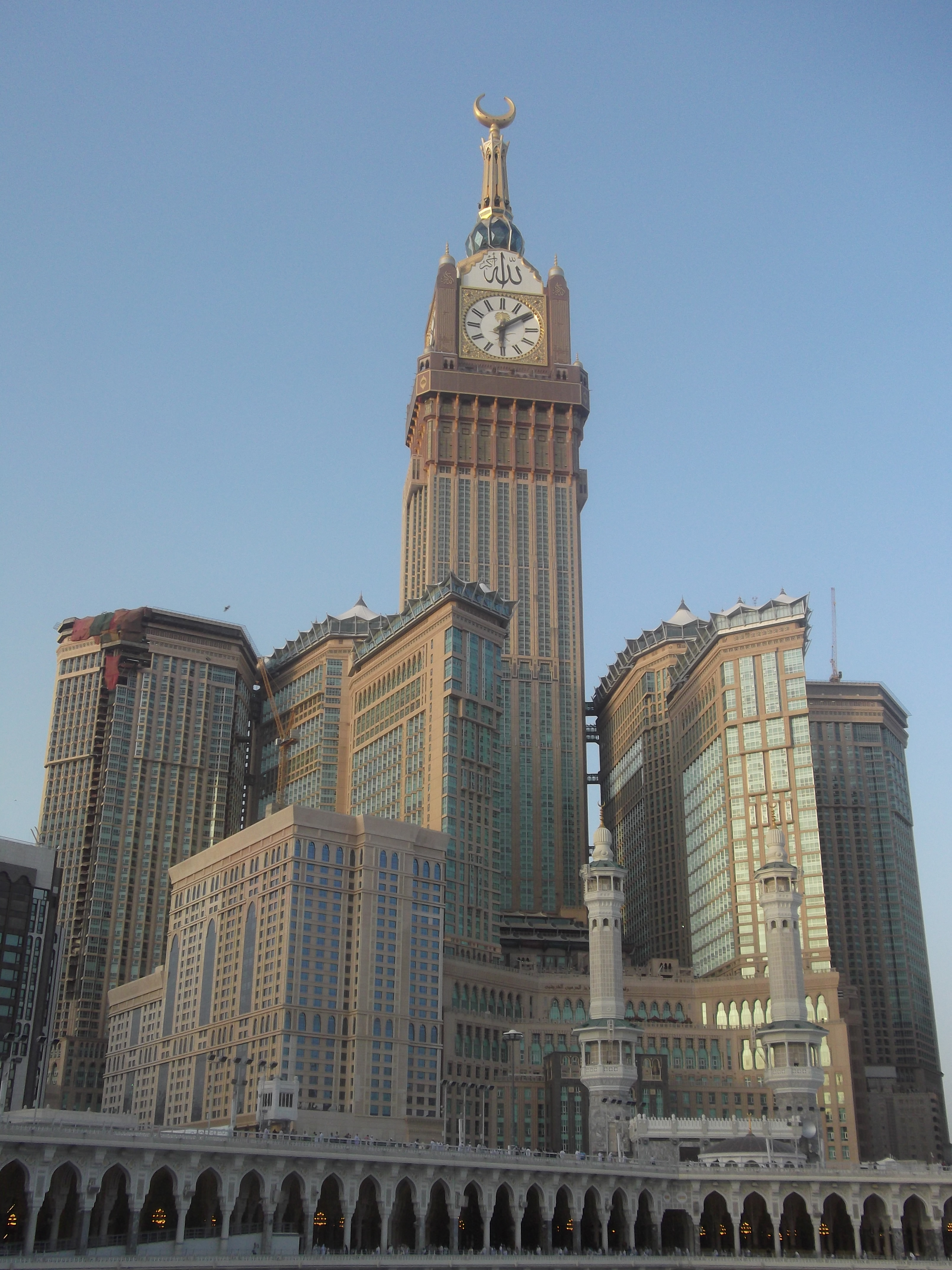
In 2010, the company opened the Makkah Royal Clock Tower, A Fairmont Hotel. The hotel located within the Abraj Al-Bait skyscraper complex.

In April 2010, Kingdom Hotels sold 22% of its shares of FRHI (from 58% to 35%) to Qatari Diar Real Estate Investment, giving them 40% of FRHI and became the second largest shareholder of the company. The remaining 60% belonged to a private shares holding in Sweden, trusted in ACCOR hotels, and other investors. The Middle East became Fairmont's new target market, where Fairmont opened in the Makkah Royal Clock Tower Hotel in 2010 and at the Palm Jumeirah in 2012. In Asia, Fairmont reopened the Peace Hotel in Shanghai in 2010, opened in Baku’s Flame Towers in 2011, and opened its first hotel in India in 2012. In the USA, Fairmont acquired the Claremont Hotel in Berkeley, California in 2014.

In 2015, AccorHotels, with the approval and support of the external party, announced the acquisition of FRHI, thus adding Raffles Hotels and Resorts, Fairmont and Swissôtel to its Luxury Hotel Brands portfolio. Acquiring Fairmont Hotels & Resorts enabled the French hotel group to gain greater access to the lucrative North American market.

In 2015, Fairmont stated it would invest in two new hotels in Egypt, in addition to its existing Fairmont hotel located in Cairo.

In 2017, Fairmont opened the Fairmont Quasar Istanbul, its first hotel in Turkey.

In 2019, Fairmont opened its first South American hotel in Brazil.

In 2021, Fairmont opened the Fairmont Taghazout Bay hotel in Morocco, and the Fairmont Ambassador Seoul in South Korea.

In 2025, Fairmont made its debut in Japan with the opening of Fairmont Tokyo, a 217-room hotel located in Shibaura, Tokyo.

== Properties ==
The following is a non-exhaustive list of hotels and resorts managed by company.

| Photo | Name | City | Country | Founded | Management assumed by Fairmont |
|---|---|---|---|---|---|
| | Fairmont Banff Springs | Banff | Canada | 1887 | 2001 |
| | Fairmont Beijing | Beijing | China | 2009 | 2009 |
| | Fairmont Century Plaza | Los Angeles | United States | 1966 | 2021 |
| | Fairmont Chateau Lake Louise | Lake Louise | Canada | 1890 | 2001 |
| | Fairmont Château Laurier | Ottawa | Canada | 1912 | 2001 |
| | Fairmont Copley Plaza | Boston | United States | 1912 | 2001 |
| | Fairmont Empress | Victoria | Canada | 1908 | 2001 |
| | Fairmont Hotel Macdonald | Edmonton | Canada | 1915 | 2001 |
| | Fairmont Hotel Vancouver | Vancouver | Canada | 1939 | 2001 |
| | Fairmont Hotel Vier Jahreszeiten | Hamburg | Germany | 1897 | 2007 |
| | Fairmont Jasper Park Lodge | Jasper | Canada | 1922 | 2001 |
| | Fairmont Le Château Frontenac | Quebec City | Canada | 1893 | 2001 |
| | Fairmont Le Château Montebello | Montebello | Canada | 1930 | 2001 |
| | Fairmont Le Manoir Richelieu | La Malbaie | Canada | 1929 | 2001 |
| | Fairmont Le Montreux Palace | Montreux | Switzerland | 1837 | 2006 |
| | Fairmont Miramar Hotel & Bungalows | Santa Monica | United States | 1921 | 2001 |
| | Fairmont Monte Carlo | Monaco | Monaco | 1975 | 2005 |
| | Fairmont Nile City | Cairo | Egypt | 2010 | 2010 |
| | Fairmont Olympic Hotel | Seattle | United States | 1924 | 2003 |
| | Fairmont Orchid | Kohala | United States | 1990 | 2002 |
| | Fairmont Pacific Rim | Vancouver | Canada | 2010 | 2010 |
| | Fairmont Palliser Hotel | Calgary | Canada | 1914 | 2001 |
| | Fairmont Peace Hotel | Shanghai | China | 1956 | 2010 |
| | Fairmont Royal York | Toronto | Canada | 1929 | 2001 |
| | Fairmont San Francisco | San Francisco | United States | 1907 | 2001 |
| | Fairmont The Norfolk Hotel | Nairobi | Kenya | 1904 | 2004 |
| | Fairmont The Palm | Dubai | United Arab Emirates | 2012 | 2012 |
| | Fairmont The Queen Elizabeth | Montréal | Canada | 1958 | 2001 |
| | Fairmont Royal Pavilion | Saint James | Barbados | 1987 | 2001 |
| | Fairmont Singapore | Singapore | Singapore | 1986 | 2007 |
| | Fairmont St Andrews | St Andrews | Scotland | 2001 | 2006 |
| | Fairmont Washington, D.C., Georgetown | Washington, D.C. | United States | 1985 | 2002 |
| | Hamilton Princess & Beach Club | Pembroke | Bermuda | 1885 | 2001 |
| | The Plaza | New York City | United States | 1907 | 2001 |
| | The Savoy | London | England | 1889 | 2004 |
| | Fairmont Cheshire, The Mere | Knutsford | England | 1834 | 2026 |

== See also ==
- 2025 Jakarta Fairmont Hotel occupation
