= Twin Falls Tea House =

Historic building in British Columbia, Canada

Coordinates: 51°32′45″N 116°31′39″W

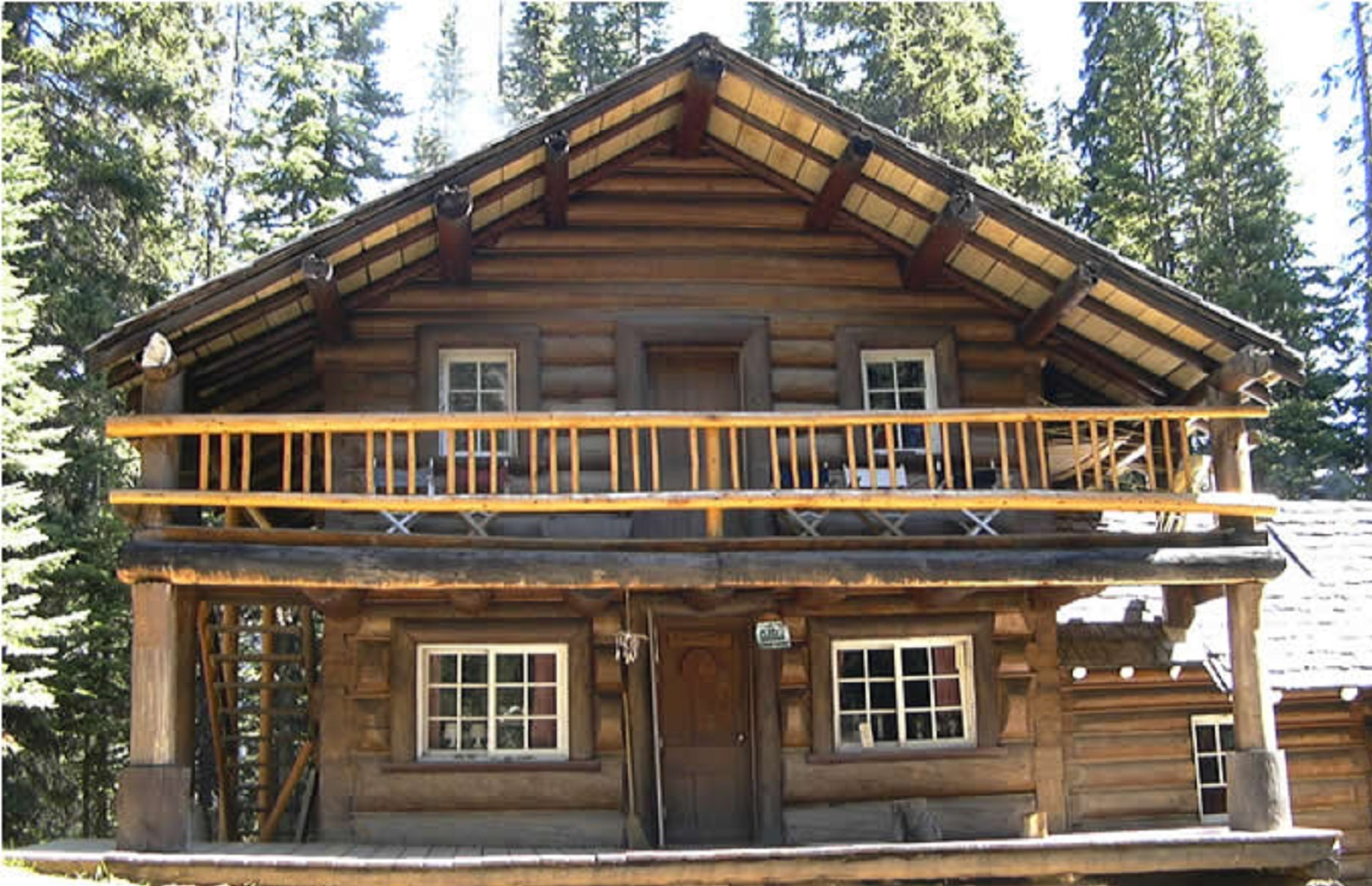
- Interactive map of Twin Falls Tea House
- Location: British Columbia, Canada

History
- Built: 1908

Site notes
- Elevation: 1800m
- Governing body: Parks Canada
- Website: Parks Canada page Twin Falls Chalet

National Historic Site of Canada
- Designated: 1992

The Twin Falls Tea House National Historic Site of Canada, located in Yoho National Park, British Columbia as a resting place for hikers and trail riders in the park. The rustic structure is located near Twin Falls in the Little Yoho Valley. The first phase of construction took place about 1908. A separate two-story cabin was built adjoining the original cabin about 1923, and the two structures were linked between 1925 and 1928. Proposed for demolition in 1969, the Tea House was designated a National Historic Site of Canada in 1992, and was extensively renovated in 2005.

== Construction ==
The first section of the Tea House was built by either the Canadian Pacific Railway or an outfitter associated with the railroad as a rest station for tour groups as the "Twin Falls Rest," formally leasing the land in 1922-23. The Tea House served meals, and was stated to be able to accommodate five overnight guests. It is located on a circuit trail that reaches the foot of Yoho Glacier and which affords a view of Twin Falls. An 8.5 kilometres (5.3 mi) trail branch provides access from Takakkaw Falls.

== Description ==
The Tea House is of peeled log construction in the rustic style popular in national parks of the time. The logs are unusually massive for such a relatively small building. The 1923 addition uses logs of similar scale to the original cabin, but employs a Swiss chalet style in its design. The balcony of the addition provides a clear view of Twin Falls. The Tea House does not have running water or electricity; food is cooked on a wood-burning stove. Sanitation is provided by outhouses, lighting by kerosene lamps. To reduce impact on the trail system, firewood is delivered by helicopter.

== History ==
The Tea House was operated by Canadian Pacific on a leasehold basis through the 1920s, 1930s and 1940s. In 1953 it was closed, as the rail tourism business declined in favour of automobile-borne tourism. In 1954 the Tea House and other CP properties were sold to Brewster and Ford Mountain Lodges Ltd., who reopened the Tea House in 1959. In 1969, Parks Canada proposed the demolition of the Tea House, citing poor repair and the absence of utilities. The seasonal proprietor, Fran Drummond, who had operated the Tea House since 1962, mounted a letter-writing campaign and gained support in the press, staving off demolition, and instigating repairs in the 1970s. In 1972 Fran Drummond took over the lease. Further repairs ensued, including a filtration system for the bucket-fed stream water supply for the kitchen and laundry. The Tea House was designated a National Historic Site of Canada in 1992. It is classified as a "recognized" Federal Heritage Building. In 2005 a $1 million renovation took place, funded partly by Heritage Canada.

== See also ==
- Canadian Pacific Hotels
