= Mount Stephen House =

Hotel

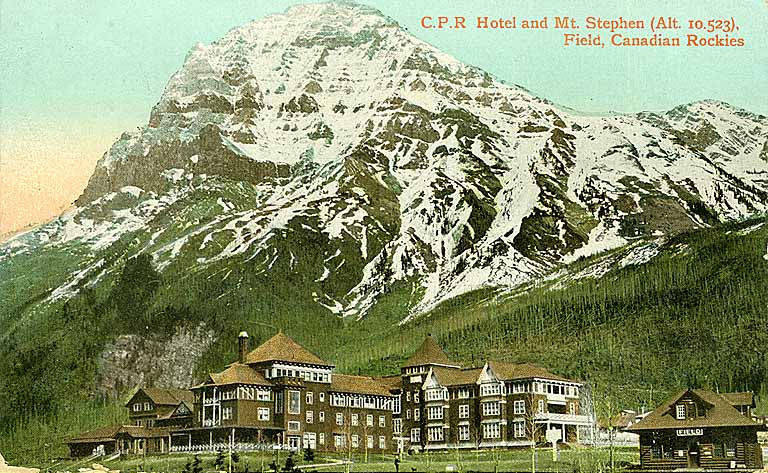
Hotel and Mount Stephen in 1908

Mount Stephen House was a hotel in Field, British Columbia, from 1886 to 1963. It was owned by the Canadian Pacific Railway (CPR), and was a central feature of Yoho National Park. It was named for the eponymous Mount Stephen, which was named for a president of the CPR, George Stephen.

Along with Glacier House in Glacier National Park and Fraser Canyon House (aka Canyon House) at North Bend in the Fraser Canyon, it was designed by Thomas Sorby. Because of the steep grade of the "Big Hill" east of Field (which climbs to the Continental Divide), heavy dining cars could not be hauled over this section of track. Mount Stephen House was designed as a simple meal stop between Banff and Golden, and also could accommodate overnight guests when it opened in the fall of 1886.

The demand for overnight visits increased as tourists began to explore the surrounding area. Between 1900 and 1902, the hotel underwent a major expansion designed by architect Francis Rattenbury. Sorby's small rectangular building was augmented with fifty new rooms, as well as amenities such as a billiards room and modern plumbing. Rattenbury changed Sorby's Alpine architecture to something closer to English Tudor design, adding gables and exposed wood beams.

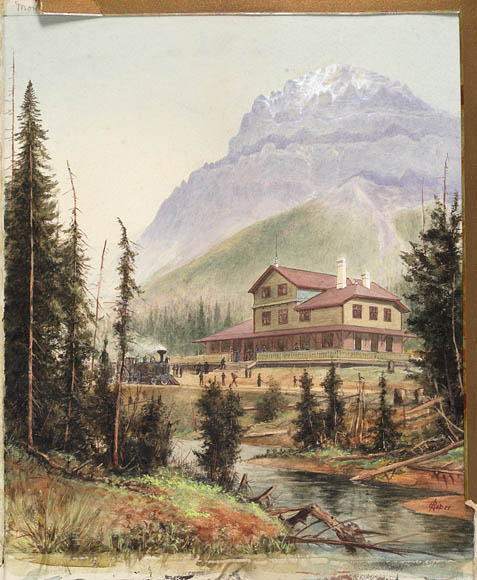
The Field Hotel below Mount Stephen, British Columbia, 1887. Watercolour by Edward Roper (1833–1909).

In its heyday between 1885 and 1918, the hotel was frequented by wealthy Europeans, and had a large dining room, ballroom, and a library. The hotel was managed by Annie Mollison; her sister Jean was the manager at Glacier House. Mount Mollison in the nearby Ottertail Range is named for the sisters. In 1918, the YMCA took over the management, and it became primarily accommodation for CPR employees. In 1953, CPR resumed the management, and the next year demolished all but the 1902 wing to provide space for a new station. In 1963, the remainder of the building was demolished.
