= Hotel Macdonald =

Hotel in Edmonton, Canada

Fairmont Hotel Macdonald
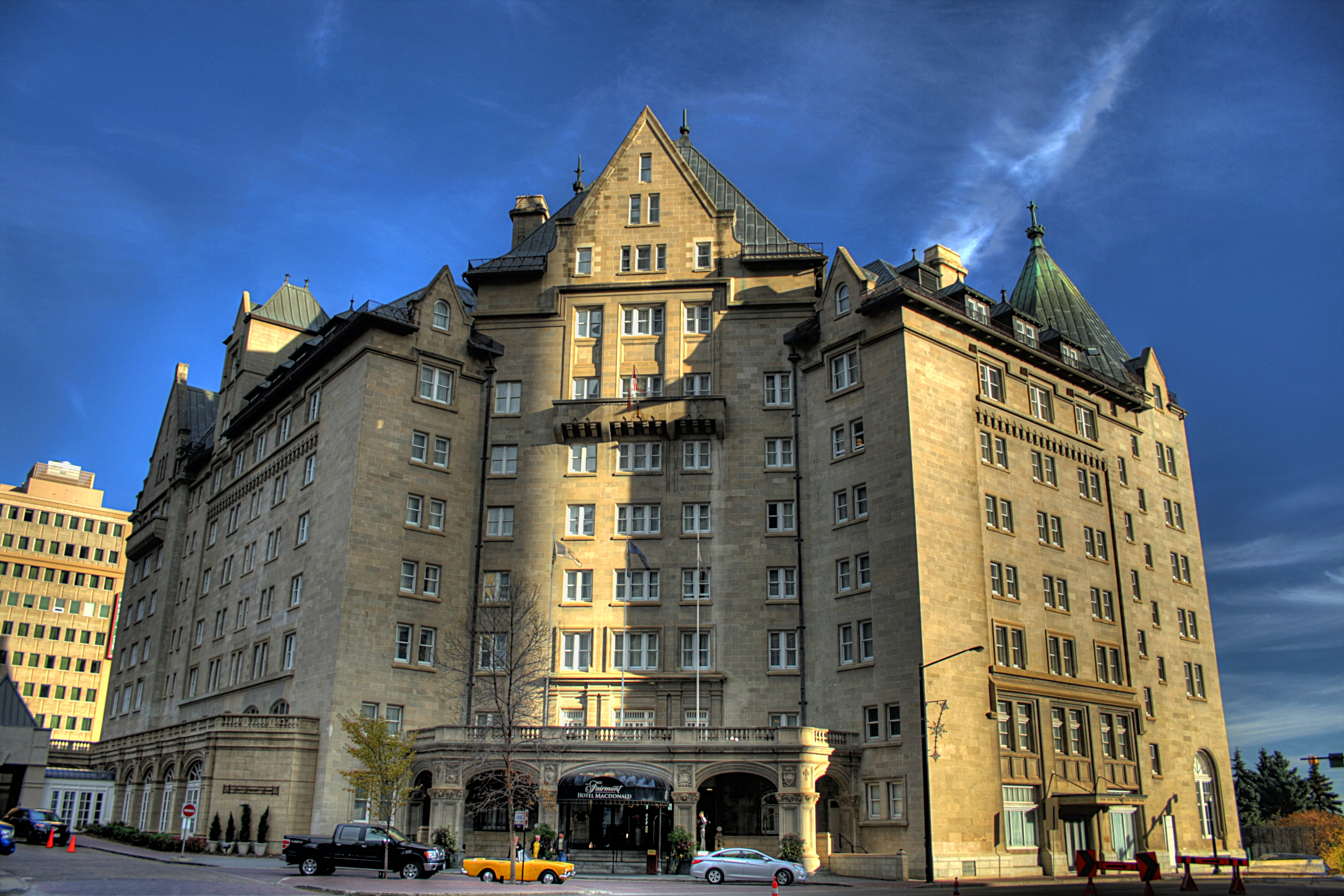
- The Hotel Macdonald in downtown Edmonton
- Former names: Hotel Macdonald (1915–2001)

General information
- Architectural style: Châteauesque
- Location: 10065 100 Street NW, Edmonton, Alberta, Canada
- Coordinates: 53°32′25″N 113°29′21″W
- Opening: 5 July 1915; 111 years ago
- Cost: $2.25 million ($60.6 million in 2025 dollars)
- Owner: InnVest Hotels
- Operator: Fairmont Hotels and Resorts

Height
- Height: 47.7 m (156 ft)

Technical details
- Floor count: 11

Design and construction
- Architect: Ross and MacFarlene
- Developer: Grand Trunk Pacific Railway

Other information
- Number of rooms: 198
- Number of restaurants: 1

Website
- www.fairmont.com/macdonald-edmonton/

Alberta Historic Resources Act
- Official name: Hotel Macdonald
- Designated: 27 November 1984

The Fairmont Hotel Macdonald, formerly and commonly known as the Hotel Macdonald (colloquially known as The Mac), is a large historic luxury hotel in Edmonton, Alberta, Canada. Located along 100 Street NW, south of Jasper Avenue, the hotel is situated in the eastern end of downtown Edmonton, and overlooks the North Saskatchewan River. The 47.7-metre-high (156 ft) hotel building was designed by Ross and MacFarlene and contains eleven floors. The hotel is named for the first prime minister of Canada, Sir John A. Macdonald.

The Grand Trunk Pacific Railway Company opened the hotel on 5 July 1915. Built as an early-20th century railway hotel, the Châteauesque-styled building is considered one of Canada's grand railway hotels. Following Grand Trunk's 1919 bankruptcy, Canadian National Hotels assumed management of the hotel. The building has undergone several renovations since its opening, and an expansion wing to the hotel building was added in 1953. In 1983, Canadian National Hotels ceased operations, and demolished the building's expansion wing in the same year. The hotel property was later sold to Canadian Pacific Hotels in 1988, and was restored and reopened to the public in May 1991. The hotel is currently managed by Fairmont Hotels and Resorts.

== Location ==
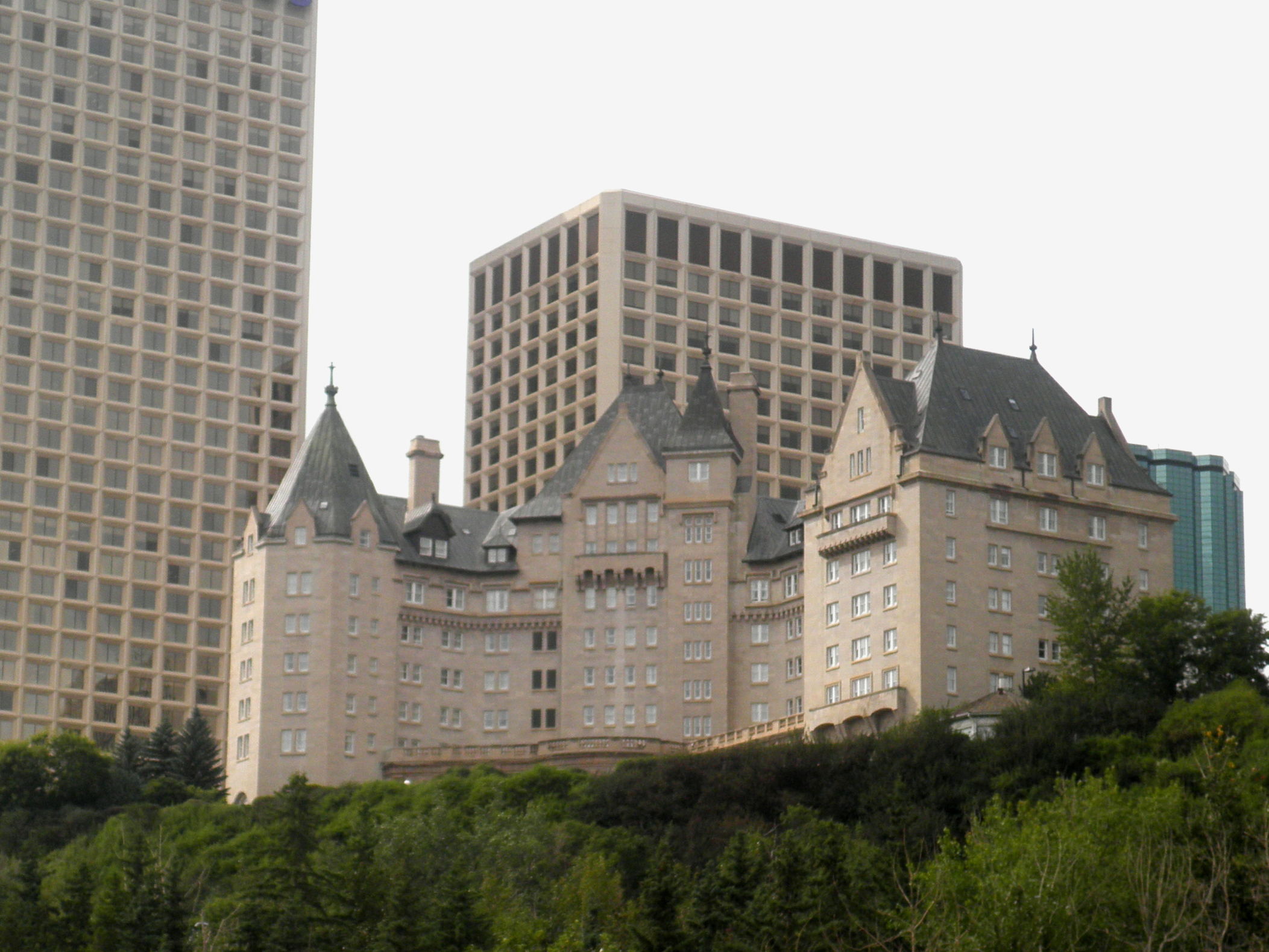
Hotel Macdonald atop the escarpment of the North Saskatchewan River

Hotel Macdonald is at 10065 100 Street NW at the eastern end of downtown Edmonton. The hotel property is bounded by 100 Street NW to the north and west, with ATB Place to the west of the hotel. Grierson Hill NW bounds the hotel property to the east and south, with the roadway situated adjacent to the North Saskatchewan River valley park system. The building overlooks the escarpment of the North Saskatchewan River.

Located at the eastern end of downtown Edmonton, south of Jasper Avenue, the hotel is situated near Edmonton's central business district and several other neighbourhoods, including Riverdale to the east and Rossdale to the south.

== Design ==
=== Architecture ===
After acquiring the property, the hotelier division of Grand Trunk Pacific Railway announced its plans to develop a hotel on the property. The building was designed by a Canadian architectural firm, Ross and MacFarlane, the same architectural firm that designed many of Canada's landmark hotels. Construction of the building took place from 1911 to 1915.

The design of the building was inspired by designs found on French Renaissance architectural-era chateaus. The pitched sloped dormered roofs includes chimneys, finials, and turrets. The building's entryways are placed diagonally on the building, flanked by perpendicular wings and turret towers. The form and massing of the hotel is defined by an L-shape. Copper was the primary metal material used to build the hotel's roof.

The façade of the building is clad with Indiana limestone, and is detailed with balustrades, balconettes, brackets, cornice, hood moulding, and overhangs. The building main portico features five arches and four pillars, and two pilasters that are detailed with gargoyles, and the provincial shields of the four provinces of Western Canada.

The building's limestone facade, copper roofing, and the interiors of five rooms, including Confederation Lounge, the Empire Ballroom, and the Wedgwood room, were recognized as a municipal historic resource on 27 November 1984, under the provincial Historic Resources Act. The resulting designation protects these features from demolition or major alterations.

=== Facilities ===
Hotel Macdonald includes 198 guest rooms and suites spread throughout the building. The hotel's suites are situated on its third, and the eighth floor, with several suites named after former guests of the hotel, including the King George VI suite, the Queen Elizabeth suite, and the Winston Churchill suite. The 220-square-metre (2,400 sq ft) third-floor Queen Elizabeth suite was built during the hotels late-1980s renovation, and was later renovated for Queen Elizabeth II's tour of Alberta in 2005. The Queen Elizabeth suite includes a full dining room, two sitting areas, and two adjoining guest rooms connected to a private lobby for service and security personnel. Access to the Queen Elizabeth suite, in addition to seven other suites on the third floor is accessible only by private elevator.

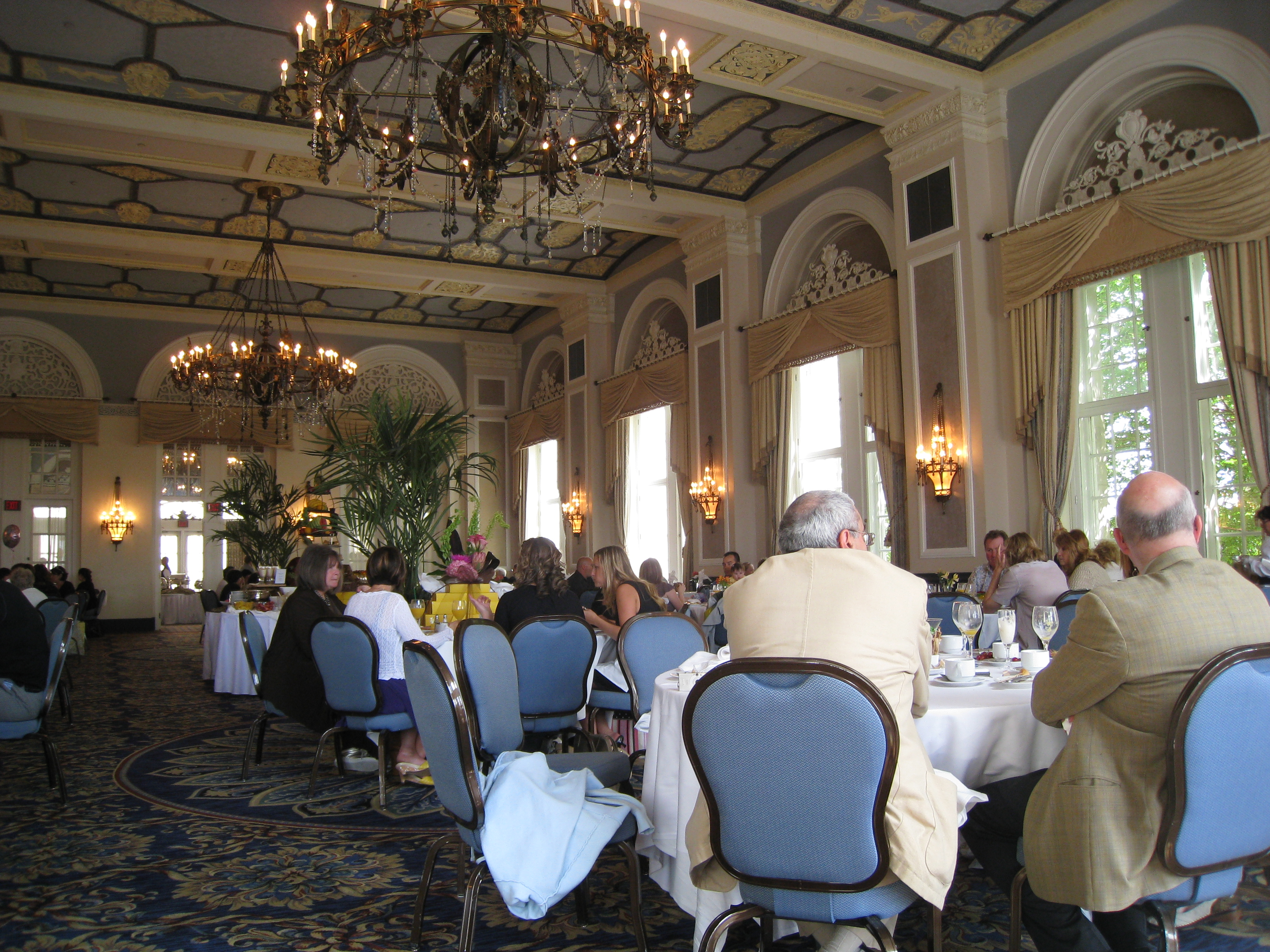
The Empire Ballroom is an event space at the hotel that features 6.4-metre (21 ft) ceilings

The hotel building also features several event spaces, including the Wedgwood room, named after the Wedgwood detailing on its ceiling; and the Empire Ballroom, an event space with 6.4-metre (21 ft) ceiling adorned with bas relief carvings. The carvings were covered under a false ceiling and were uncovered during the hotels' renovations in the late-1980s. Confederation Lounge serves as the hotel's lounge, and is named after a replica painting of Conference at Québec in 1864, to settle the basics of a union of the British North American Provinces by Robert Harris, that hangs above the lounge's fireplace.

Other facilities on the hotel property include squash courts, aerobic facilities, minibars, and an electronic security system. The hotel also operates one restaurant, known as The Harvest Room.

== History ==
Prior to the establishment of the hotel on the property, the area housed a squatters camp, colloquially known as "Galician Hotel," after a number of Ukrainian-speaking migrants from the Austro-Hungarian province of Galicia settled there.

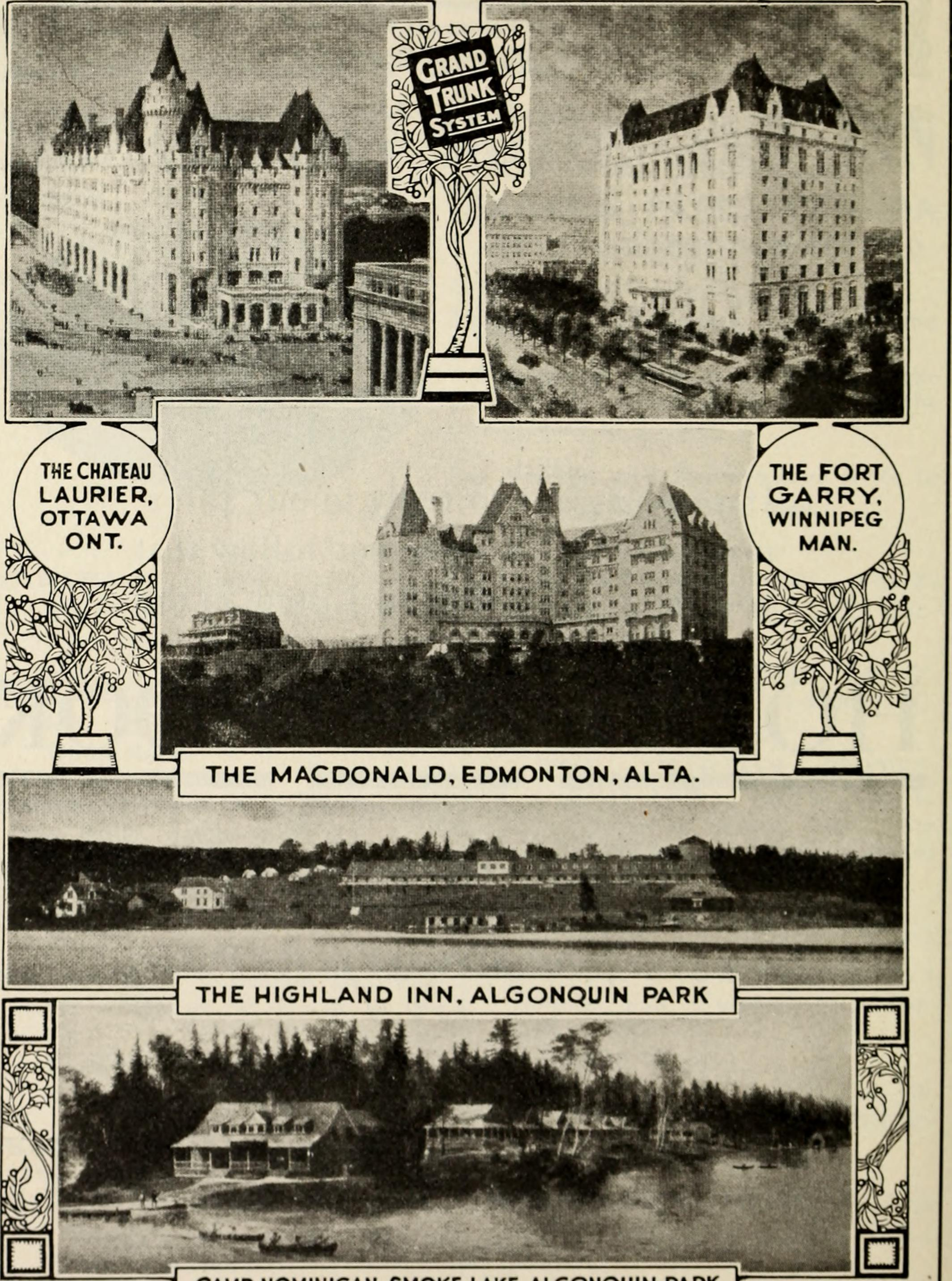
Grand Trunk Pacific Railway hotels in The Official Hotel Red Book and Directory for 1917. Hotel Macdonald is depicted in the centre.

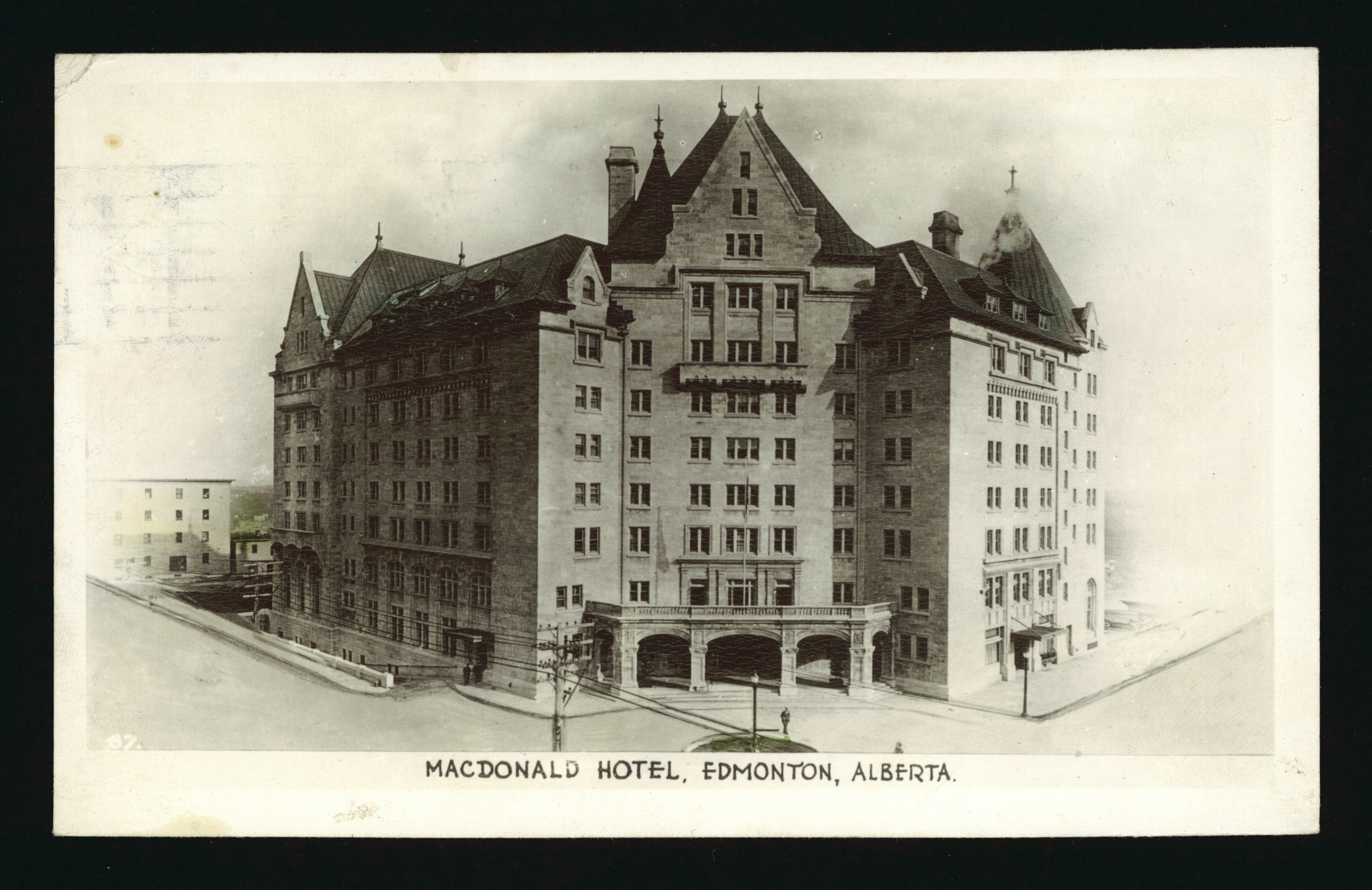
The hotel in 1948

Grand Trunk Pacific Railway purchased the property and began construction for a hotel building in 1911, with designs from Ross and Macdonald. The building was completed at a cost of $2.25 million, and was opened to the public on 5 July 1915. The hotel was named after John A. Macdonald, the first prime minister of Canada (or, as another source has it, perhaps for old-time furtrader John MacDonald of Garth). The building was operated by Grand Trunk Pacific until the company declared bankruptcy in 1919, after which it was operated as a part of Canadian National Hotels, a division of Canadian National Railway.

The hotel was one of the first two establishments that the Alberta Liquor Control Board issued a licence to serve alcohol, after the province repealed its prohibition law against private sale of alcohol in 1924. King George VI and Queen Elizabeth used the hotel during their 1939 royal tour of Canada.

In an effort to meet post-war population boom of the city, Canadian National built an expansion in 1949 with an estimated construction cost of $4,000,000. The 16-storey wing which added 292-rooms was colloquially referred to as The Box because of its modern design and occupied the space just north of the original building. Critics labeled the design of the structure as startling when it was unveiled, but railway officials stood by their choice stating that the new facility would become the hotel and the old structure would become the annex.

In 1983, Canadian National Railway closed the hotel and announced major renovations to the property which included the demolition of The Box and restoration of the 1915 building. Plans were in place to build a complementary addition to the hotel, as well as two office towers, although these expansion plans never came to fruition. In an effort to protect the building from potential demolition, the City of Edmonton designated the hotel a "municipal heritage resource" in 1984. The 1953 annex was finally demolished in 1986.

The hotel and eight other properties of Canadian National Hotels were sold to Canadian Pacific Hotels in 1988, with the company undertaking a three-year, $28-million renovation of the property, which included upgrading systems and restoring the original façade. Canadian Pacific Hotels reopened the property on 15 May 1991.

In 2001, Canadian Pacific Hotels reorganized into Fairmont Hotels and Resorts, adopting the Fairmont name from an American company it had purchased in 1999. As a result of the rebranding, Hotel Macdonald was renamed Fairmont Hotel Macdonald.

Preceded by McLeod Building	Tallest building in Edmonton; 1953–1965; 47.7 m (156 ft)	Succeeded by Garneau Towers
