= Châteauesque =

Revival architectural style

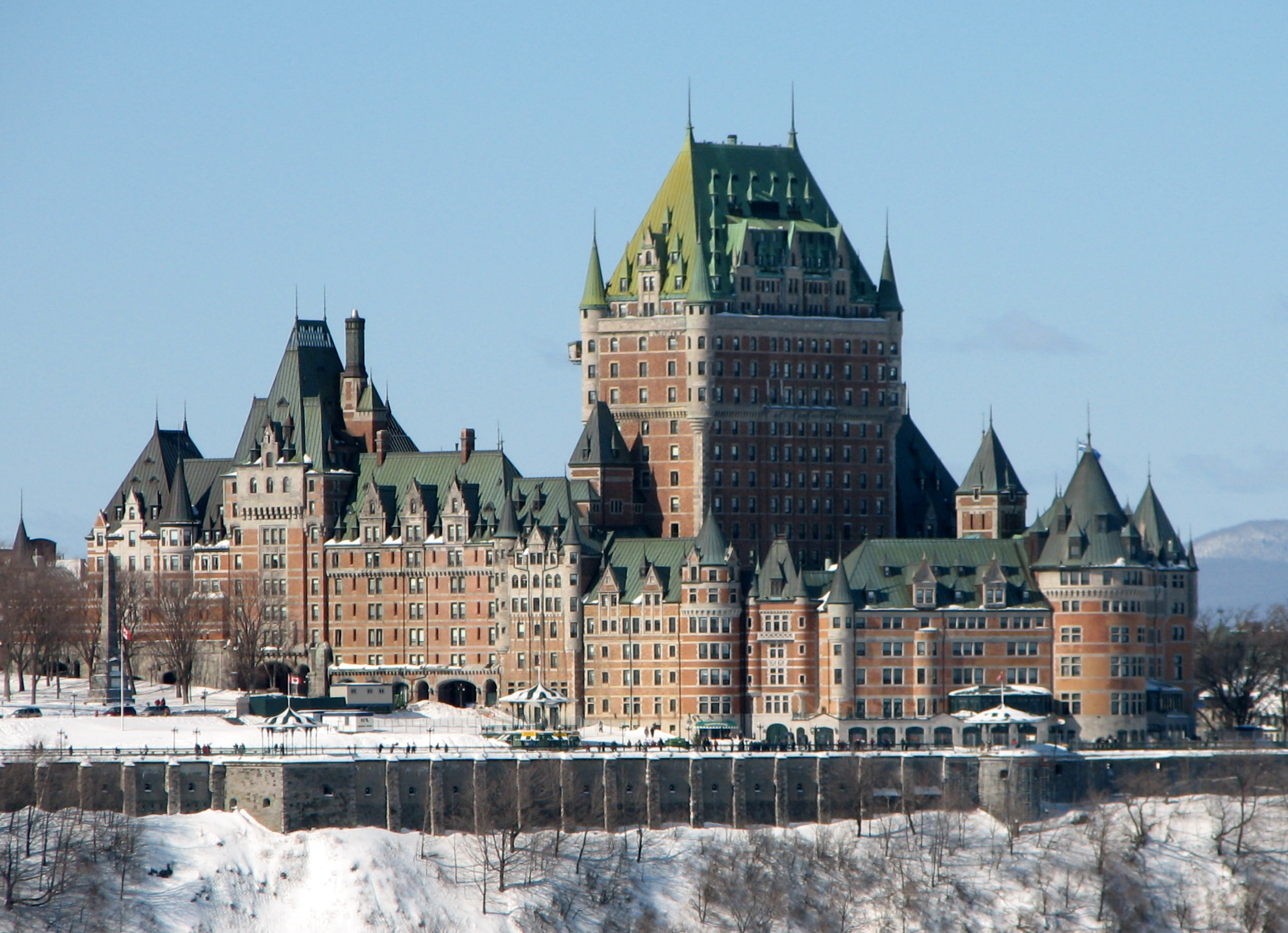
Château Frontenac, a hotel in Quebec City, Quebec, Canada, completed in 1893

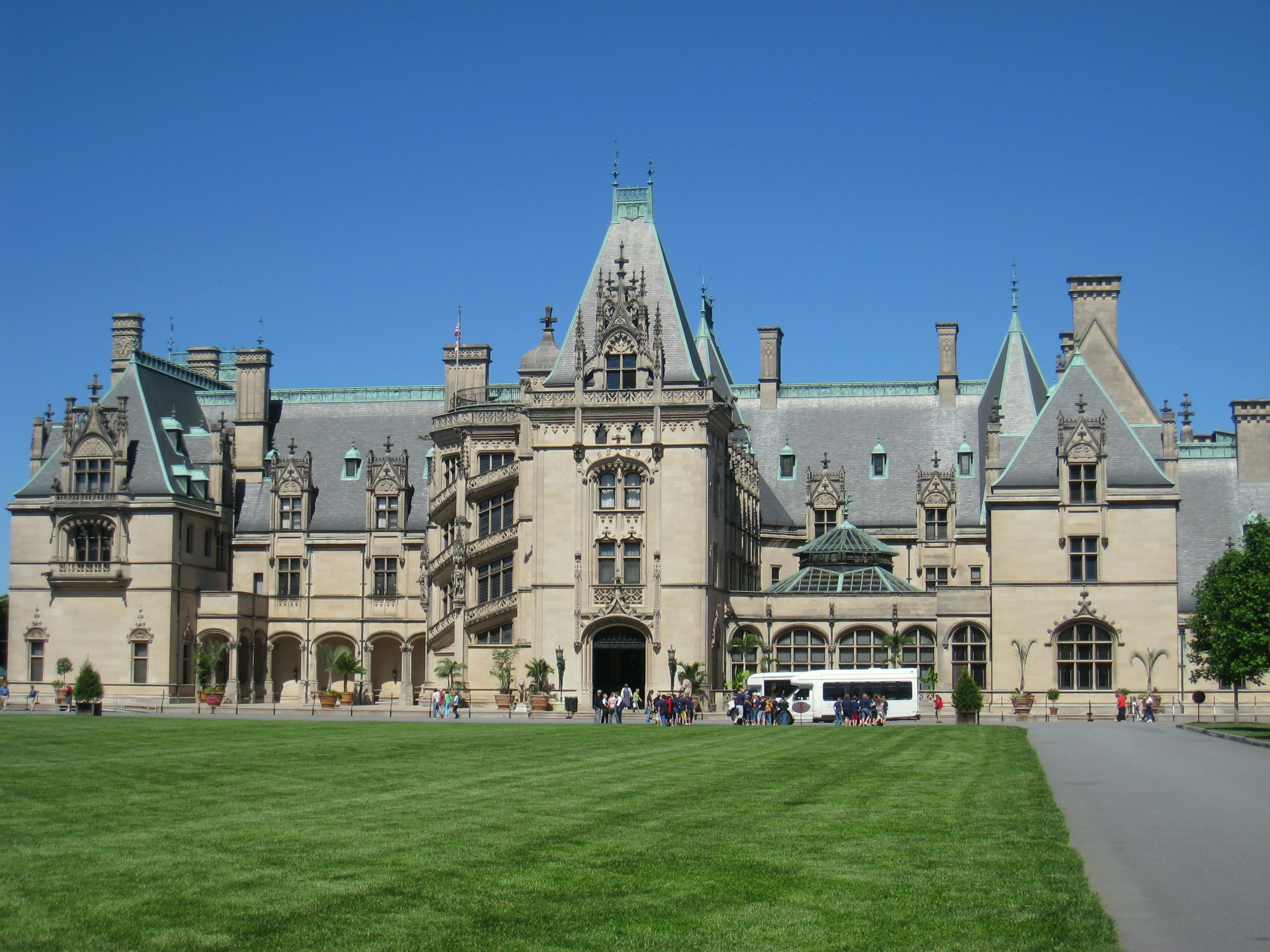
Biltmore, a Vanderbilt house in Asheville, North Carolina, US, completed in 1895

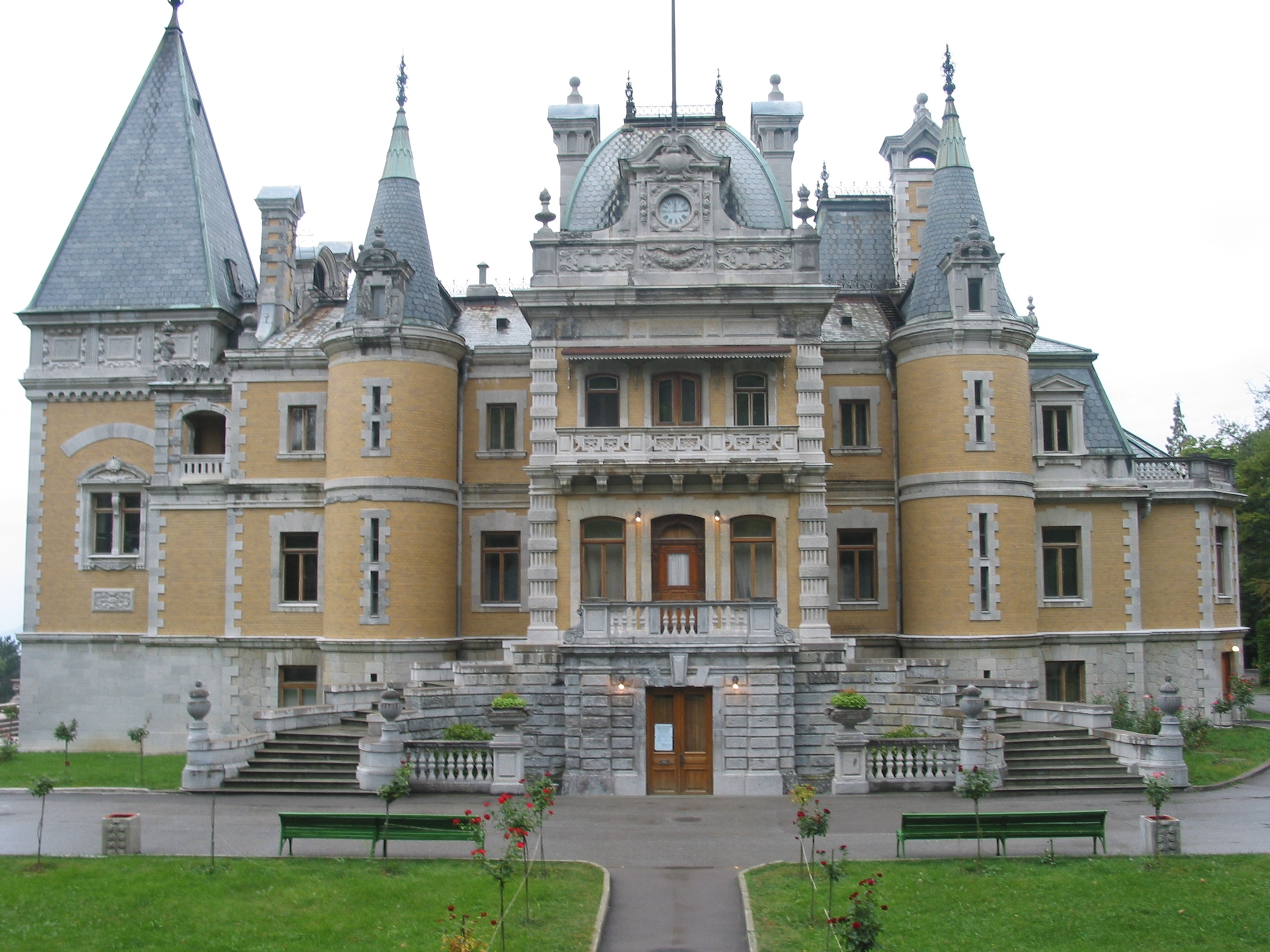
Massandra Palace, a Russian emperor's villa in Crimea, completed in 1900

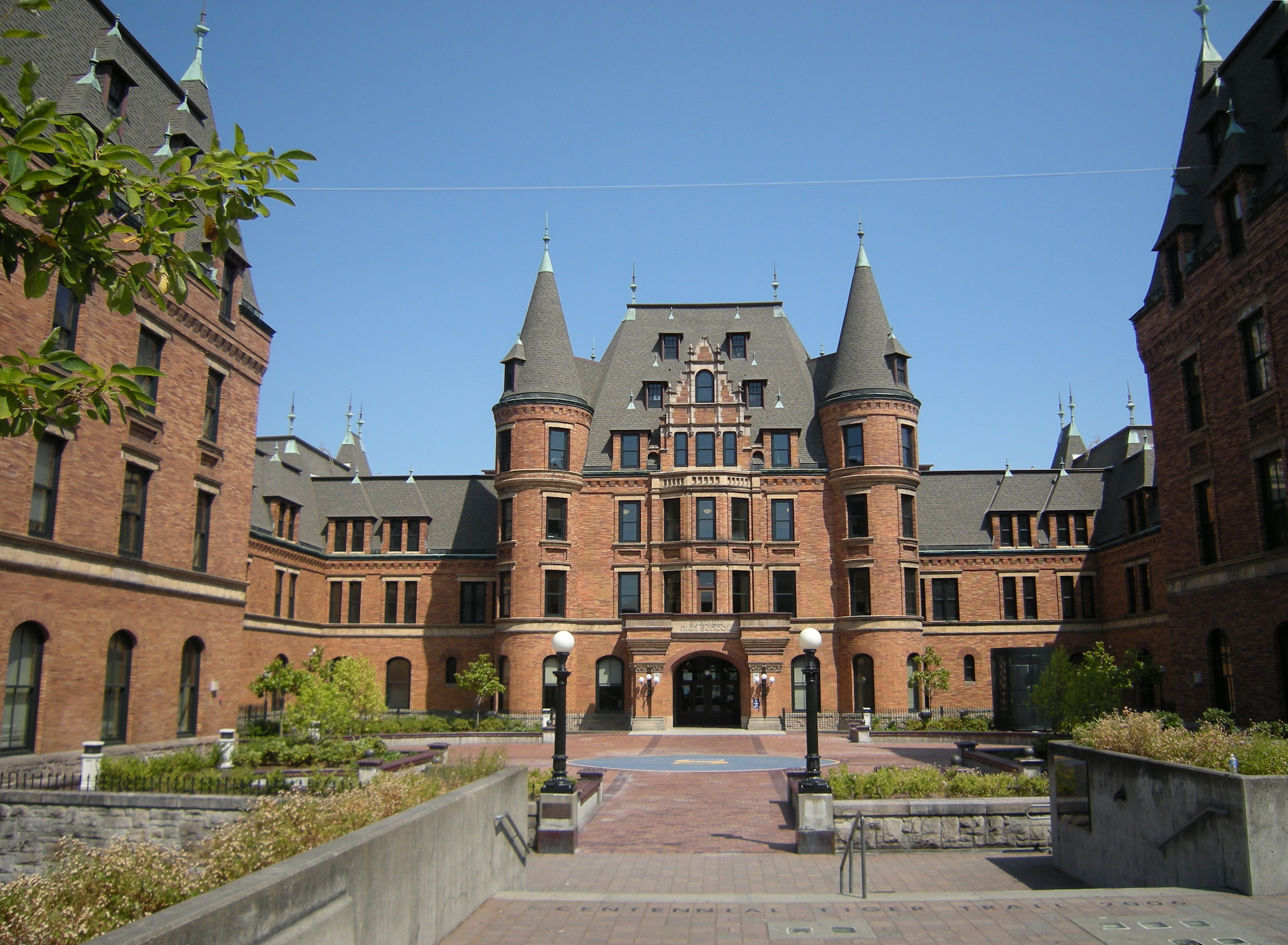
Stadium High School, a secondary school in Tacoma, Washington, USA, completed in 1906

Châteauesque (or Francis I style, or in Canada, the Château Style) is a revivalist architectural style based on the French Renaissance architecture of the monumental châteaux of the Loire Valley from the late fifteenth century to the early seventeenth century.

The term châteauesque (literally, "château-like") is credited (by historian Marcus Whiffen) to American architectural historian Bainbridge Bunting, although it can be found in publications that pre-date Bunting's birth. As of 2011, the Getty Research Institute's Art & Architecture Thesaurus includes both "Château Style" and "Châteauesque", with the former being the preferred term for North America.

The style frequently features buildings heavily ornamented by the elaborate towers, spires, and steeply pitched roofs of sixteenth century châteaux, themselves influenced by late Gothic and Italian Renaissance architecture. Despite their French ornamentation, as a revival style, buildings in the châteauesque style do not attempt to completely emulate a French château. Châteauesque buildings are typically built on an asymmetrical plan, with a roof-line broken in several places and a facade composed of advancing and receding planes.

== History ==
The style was popularized in the United States by Richard Morris Hunt. Hunt, the first American architect to study at the École des Beaux-Arts in Paris, designed residences, including those for the Vanderbilt family, during the 1870s, 1880s and 1890s. A relatively rare style in the United States, its presence was concentrated in the Northeast, although isolated examples can be found in nearly all parts of the country. It was mostly employed for residences of the extremely wealthy, although it was occasionally used for public buildings.

The first building in this style in Canada was the 1887 Quebec City Armoury (now named the Voltigeurs de Québec Armoury, formerly called the Grande-Allée Armoury (French: Manège militaire Grande-Allée, or simply Manège militaire) designed by Eugène-Étienne Taché. Many of Canada's grand railway hotels, designed by John Smith Archibald, Edward Maxwell, Bruce Price and Ross and Macdonald, were built in the Châteauesque style, with other mainly public or residential buildings. The style may be associated with Canadian architecture because these grand hotels are prominent landmarks in major cities across the country and in certain national parks.

In Hungary, Arthur Meinig built numerous country houses in the Loire Valley style, the earliest being Andrássy Castle in Tiszadob, 1885–1890, and the grandest being Károlyi Castle in Nagykároly (Carei), 1893–1895.

The style began to fade after the turn of the 20th century, and it was largely absent from new construction by the 1930s.

== Architects who designed in Châteauesque style ==
- John Smith Archibald of Archibald and Schofield
- Bradford Gilbert
- Bruce Price
- Edward Maxwell
- Eugène-Étienne Taché
- Francis Rattenbury
- Sproatt and Rolph
- Hippolyte Destailleur
- Richard Morris Hunt
- Ross and Macfarlane, Ross and Macdonald
- Solon Spencer Beman
- Walter-André Destailleur
- William Lightfoot Price
- William Henry Crossland
- Henry Heistand [founder of Miami University's(OH) architecture program]

== Examples in Europe ==
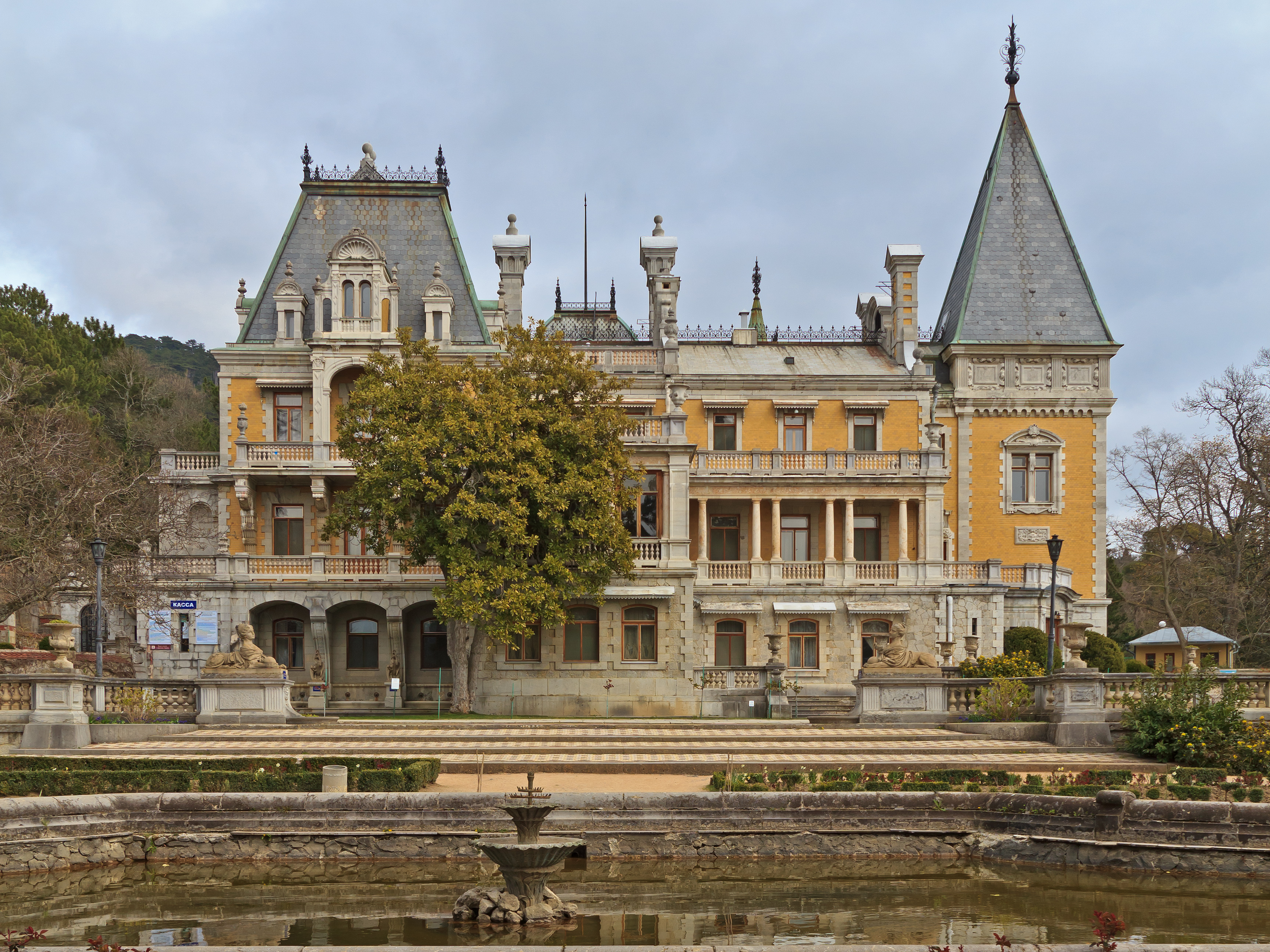
Massandra Palace, Crimea (1900 palace)

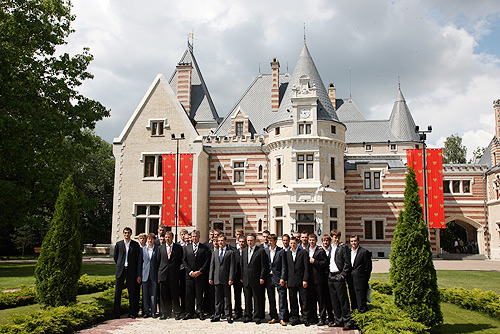
Meyendorff Castle near Moscow (1874–1885)

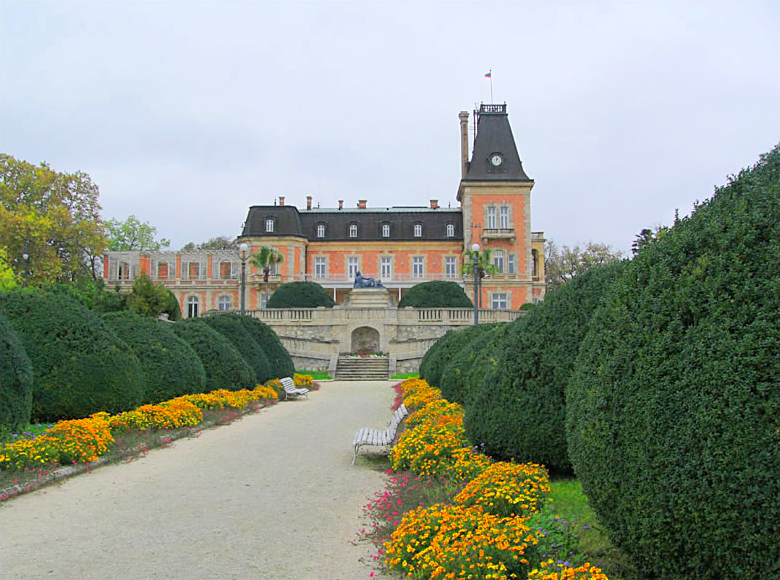
Euxinograd, Varna, Bulgaria

=== United Kingdom ===
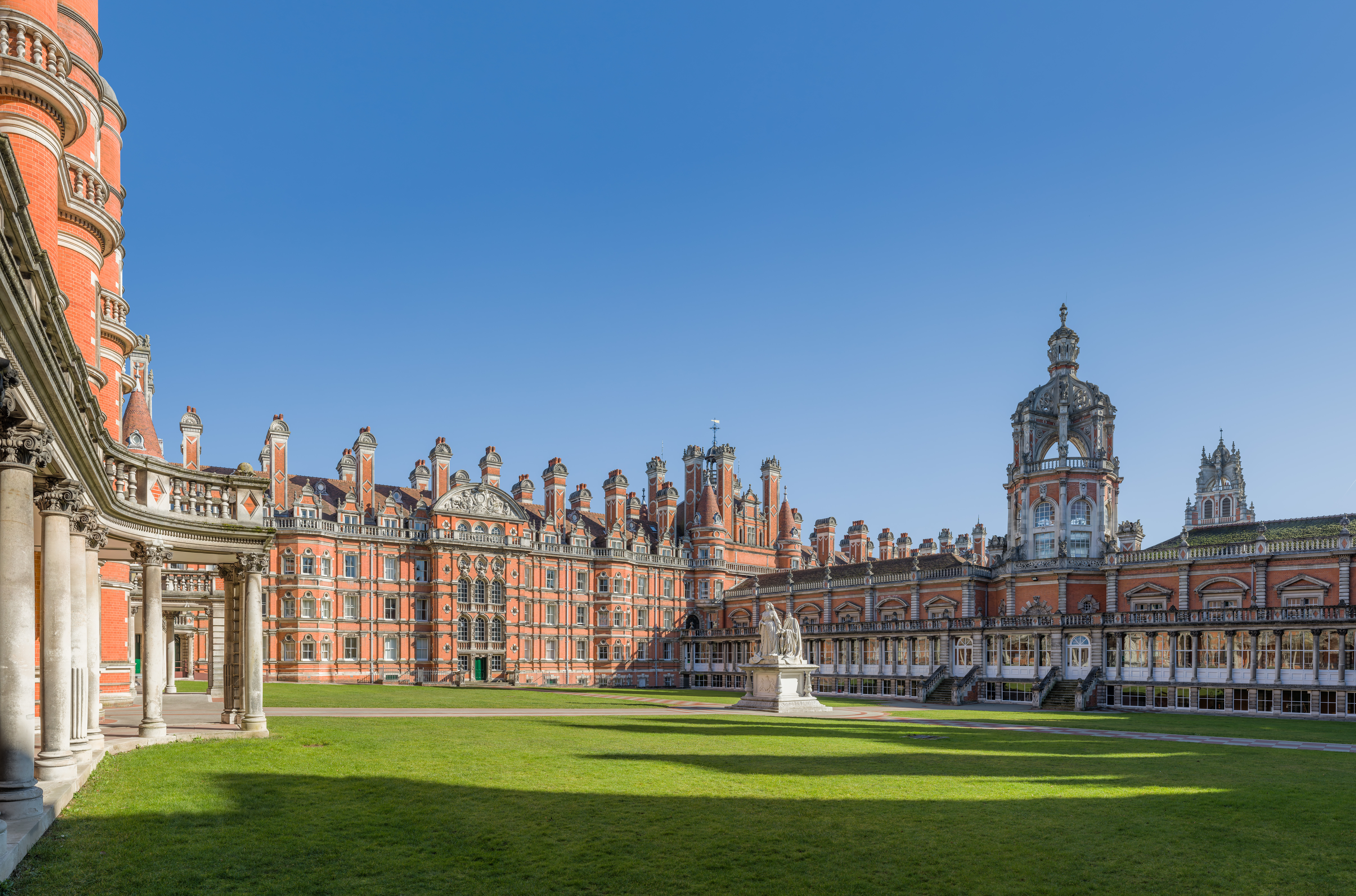
Founder's Building, Royal Holloway, University of London, Surrey, England, 1874-1881

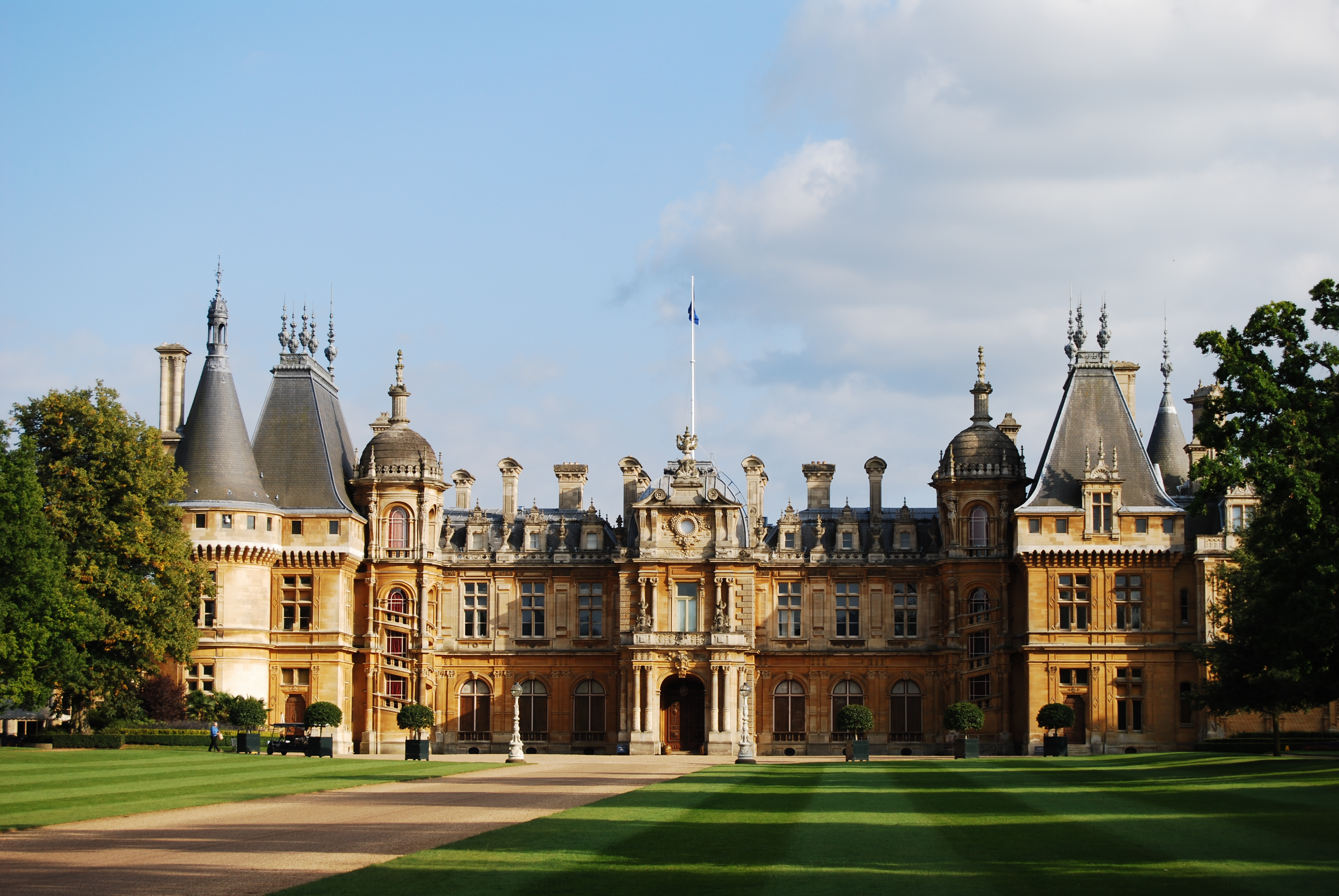
Waddesdon Manor, Buckinghamshire, England 1874–1889

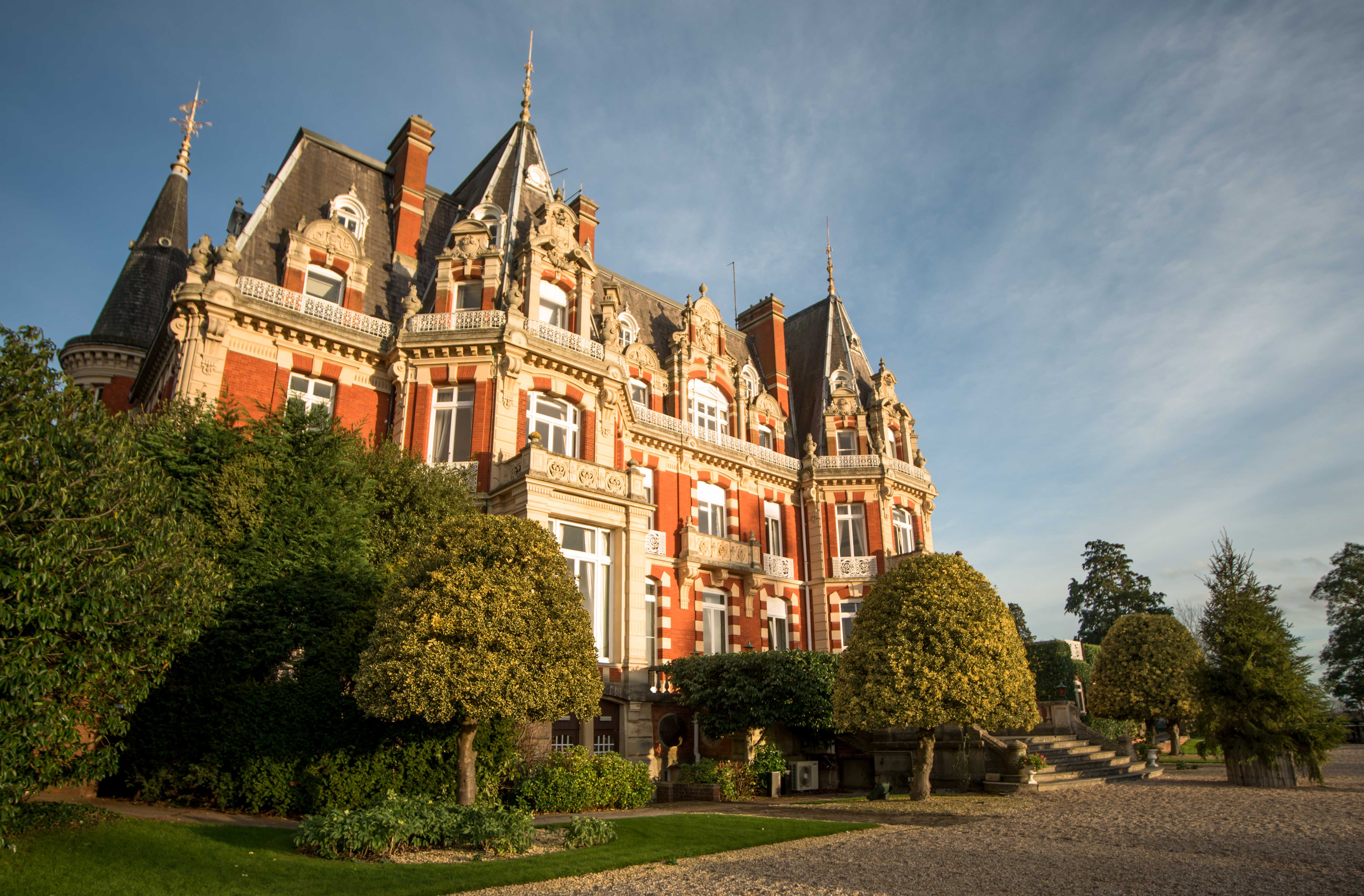
Chateau Impney, Worcestershire.

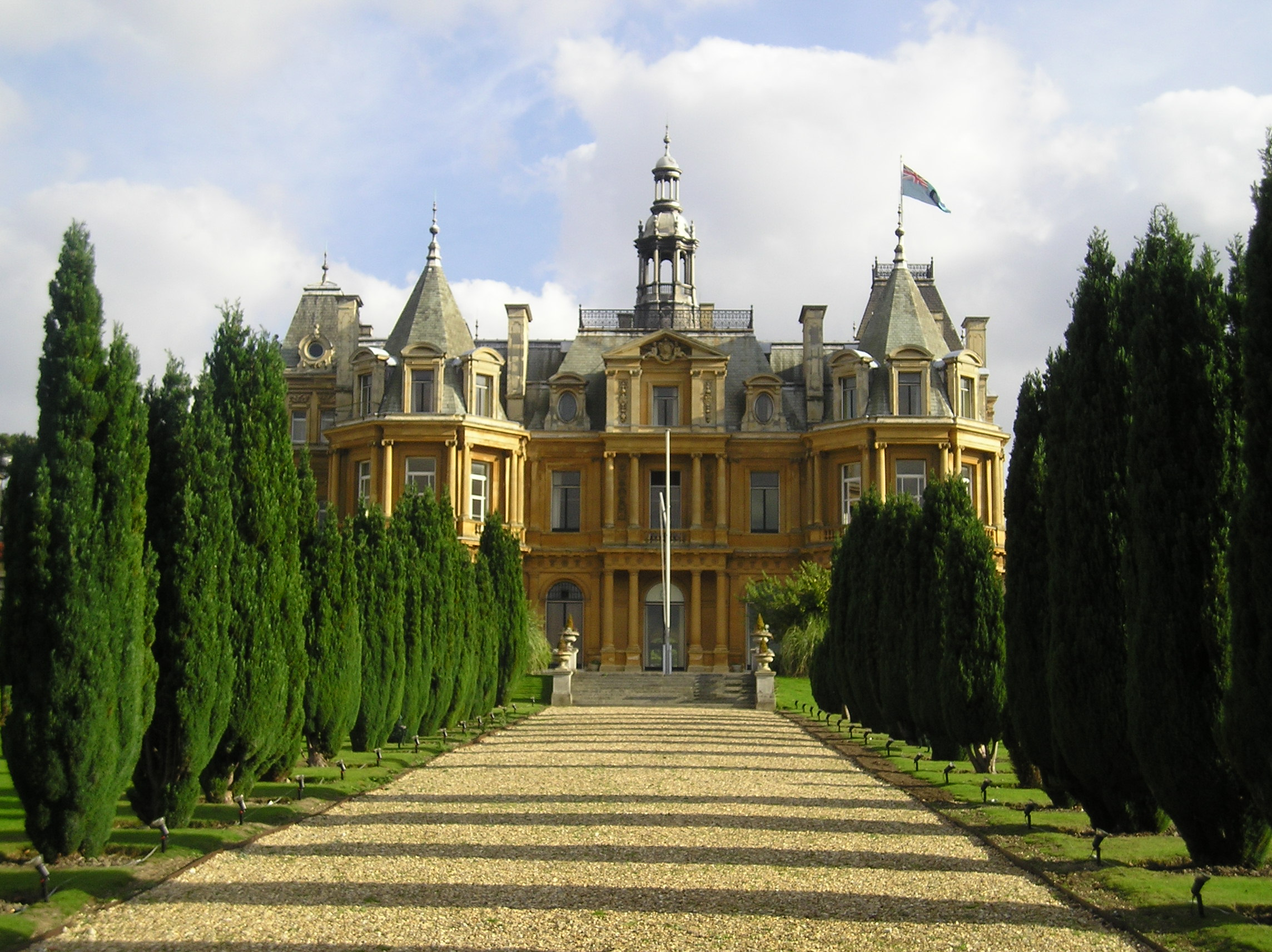
Halton House, Buckinghamshire.

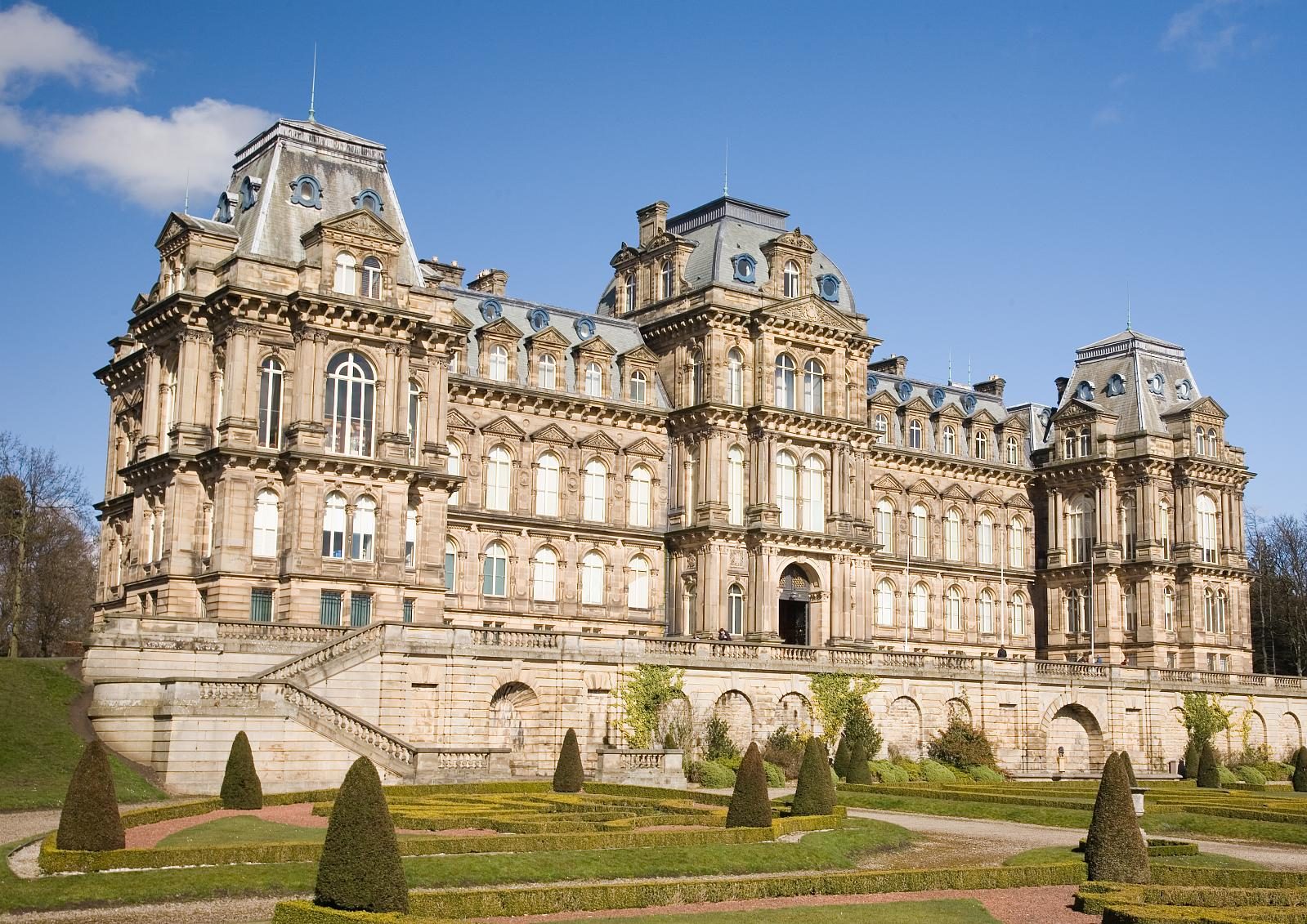
Bowes Museum, County Durham.

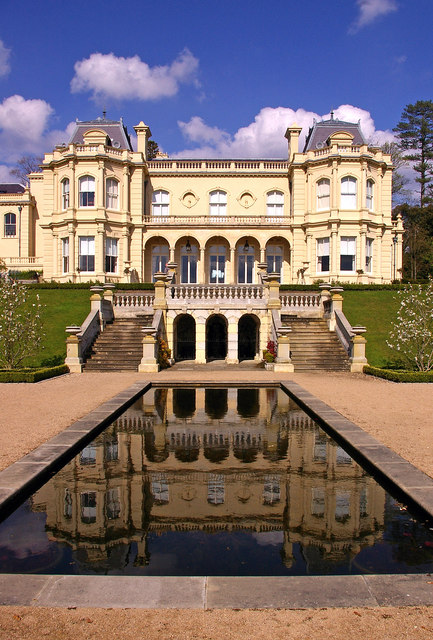
Cherkley Court, Surrey.

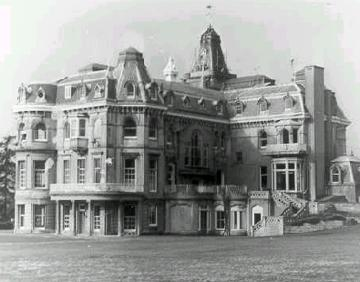
Park Place Berkshire.

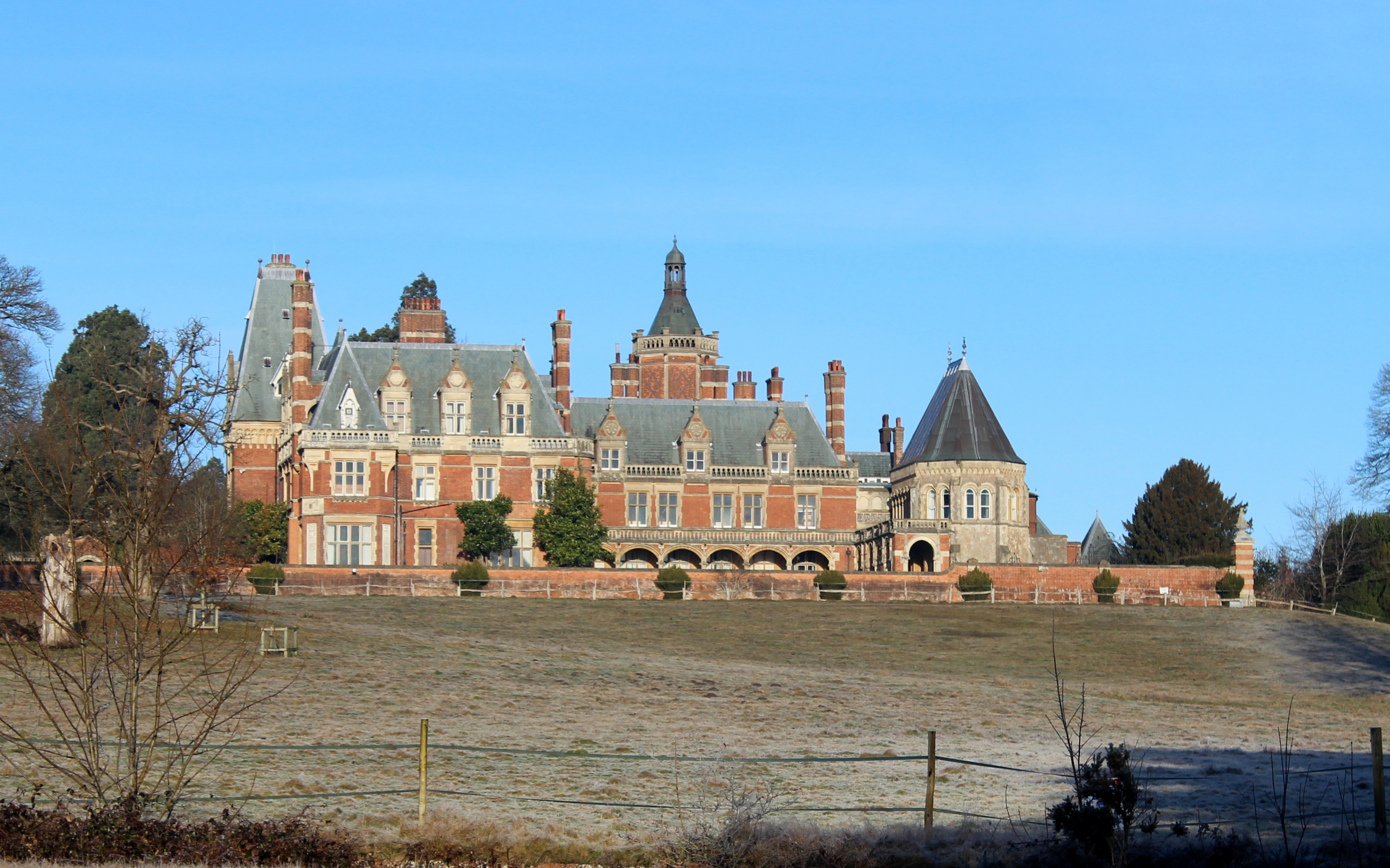
Minley Manor, Hampshire.

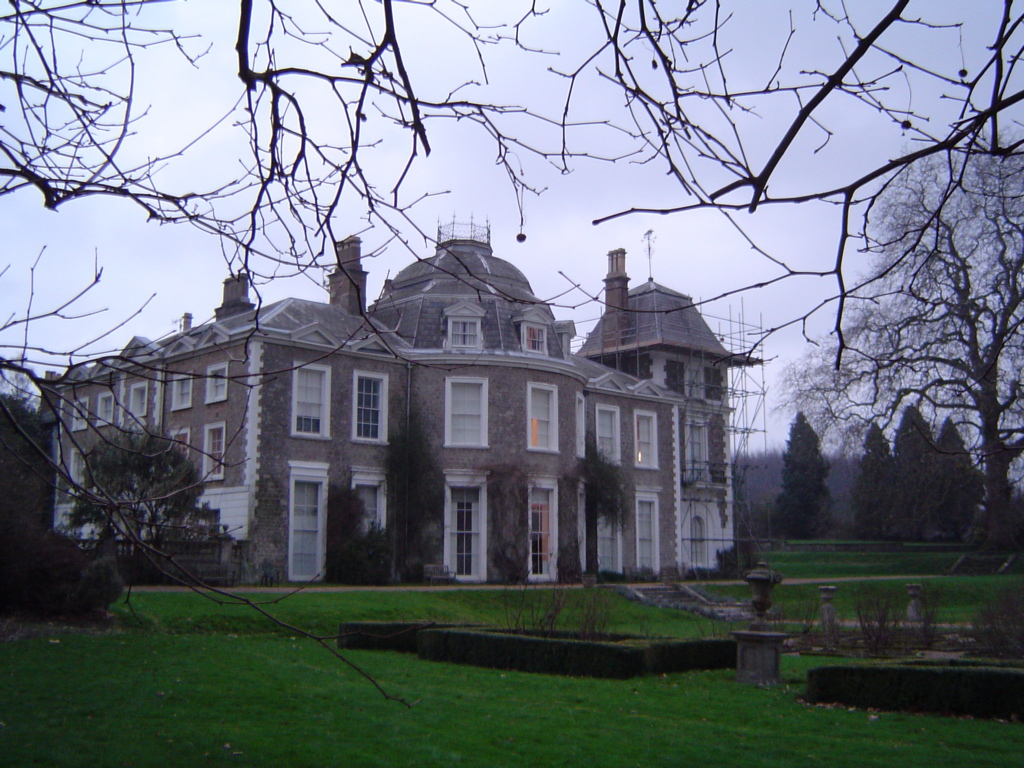
Oxon Hoath, West Peckham, Kent

== Examples in the United States ==
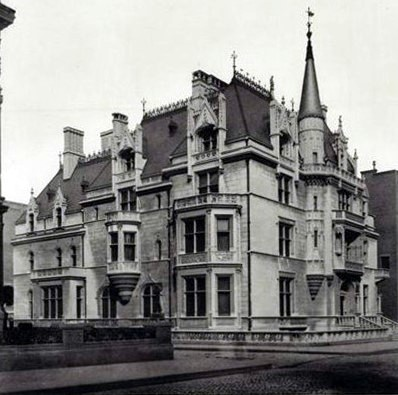
William K. Vanderbilt residence, Petit Chateau, 1878–82, Manhattan, by Richard Morris Hunt.

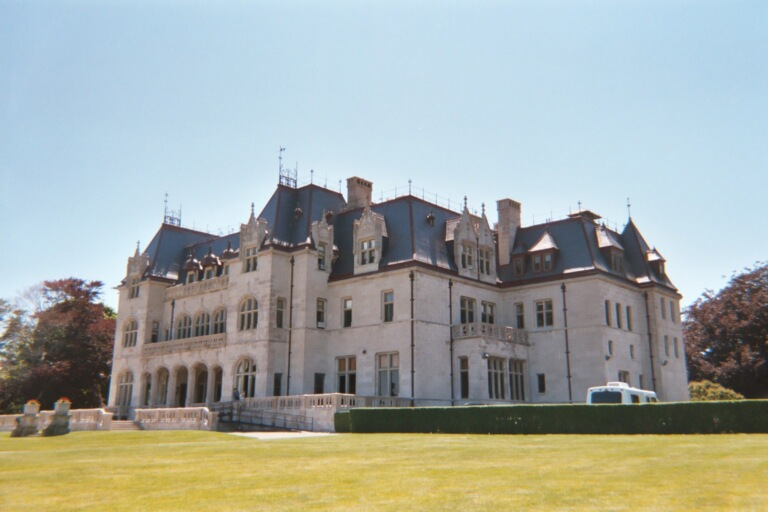
Ochre Court, Newport, Rhode Island, 1892

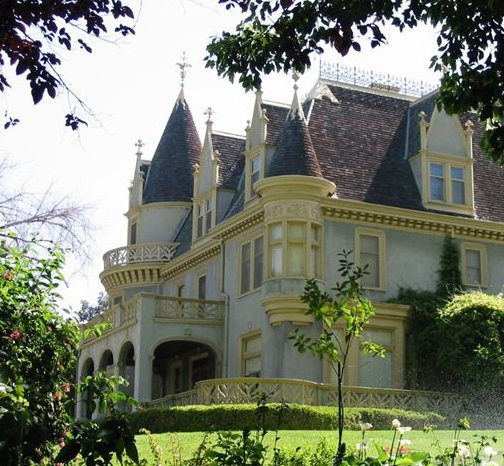
Kimberly Crest, Redlands, California, 1897, Dennis and Farwell, architects

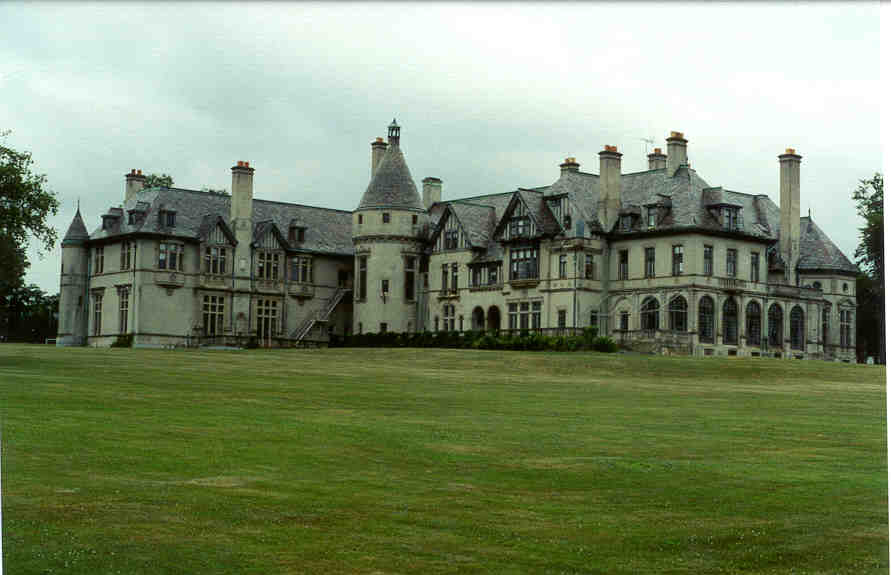
Carey Mansion, Newport, Rhode Island

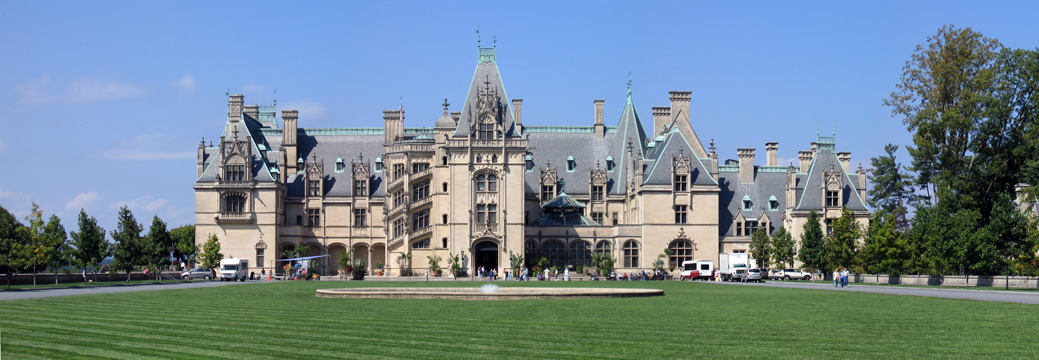
Biltmore Estate, 1890–95, Asheville, North Carolina, Richard Morris Hunt, architect

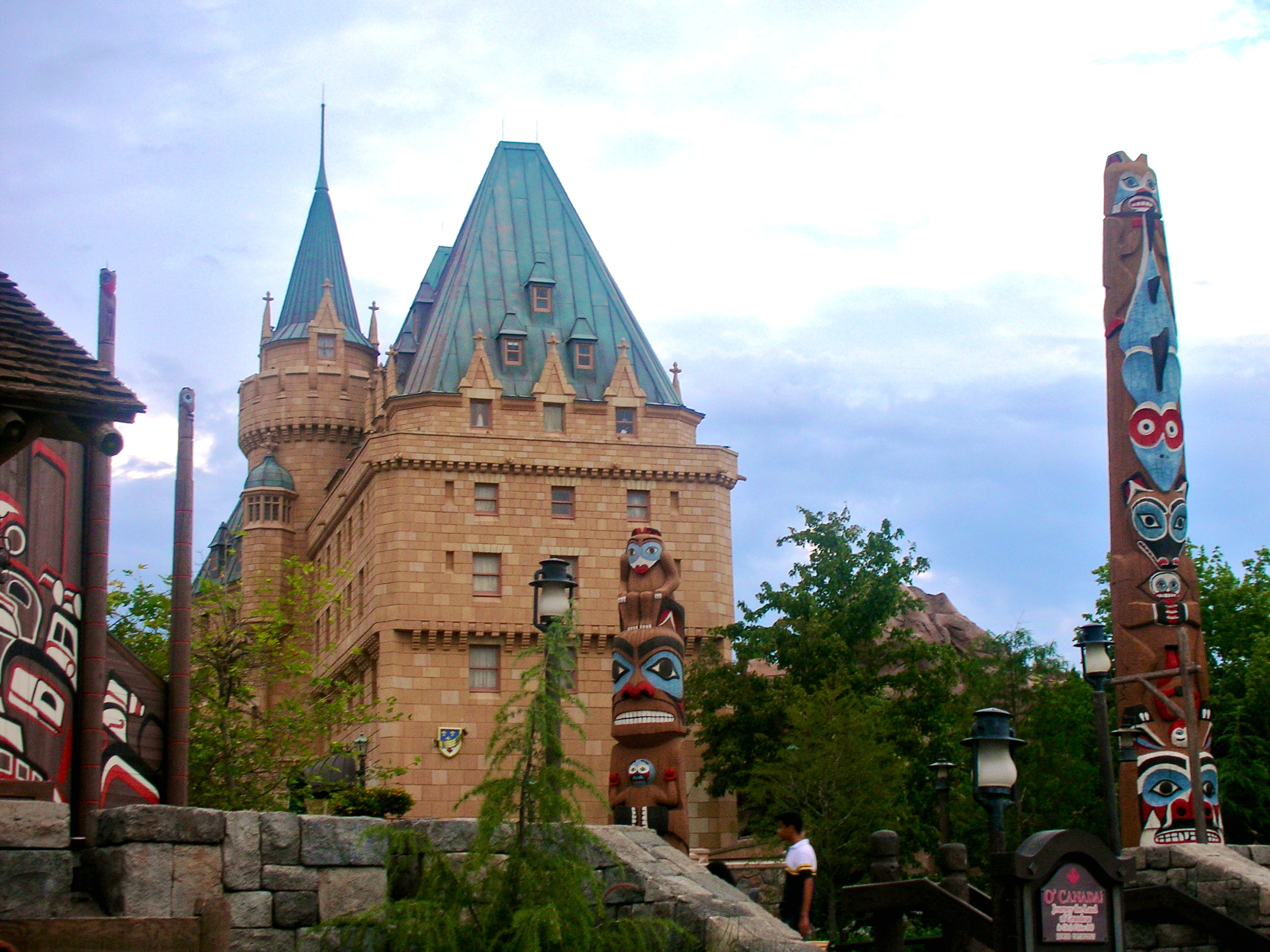
Hotel du Canada, Orlando, Florida, 1982

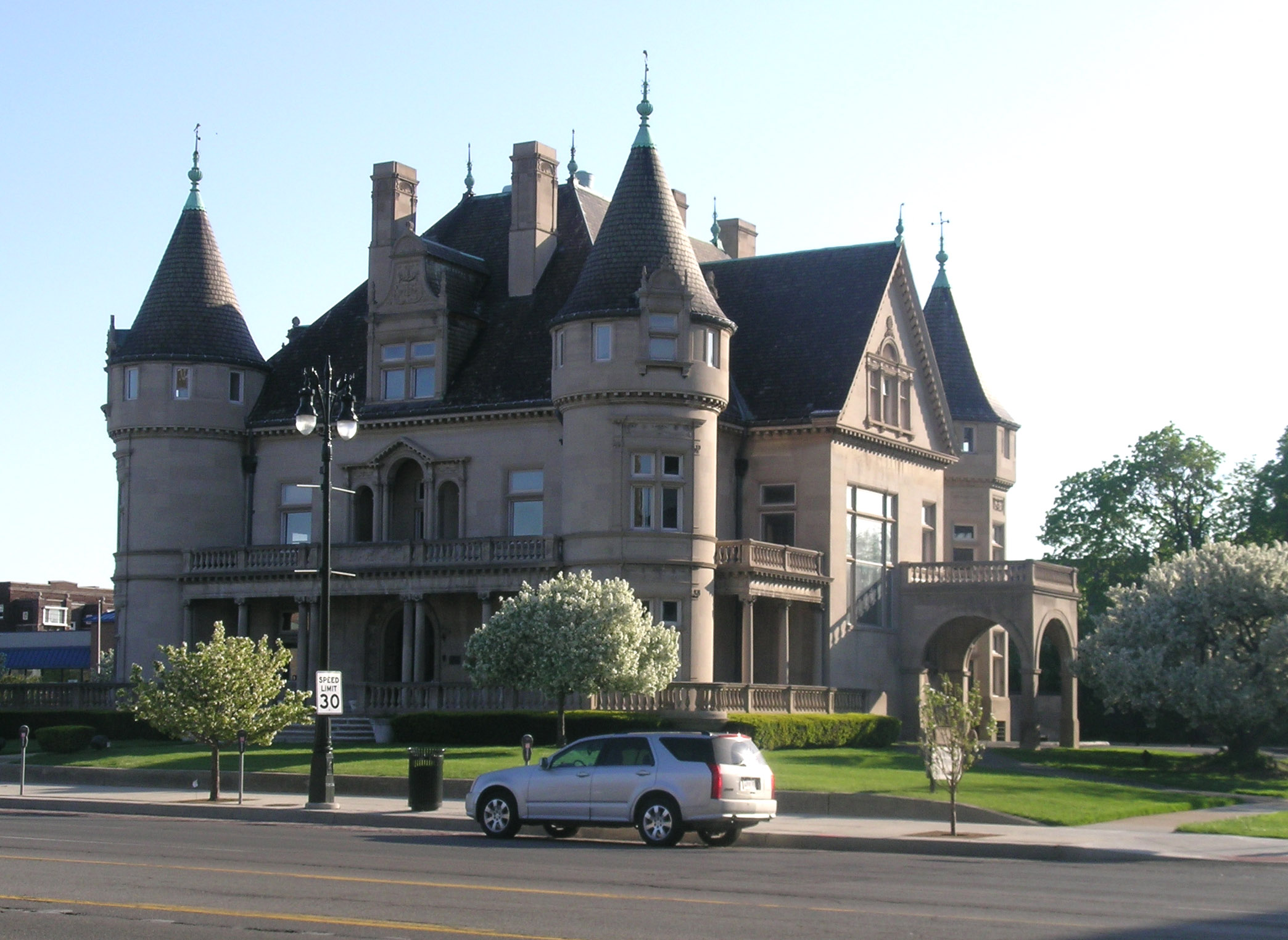
Col. Frank J. Hecker House, Detroit, Michigan, 1888

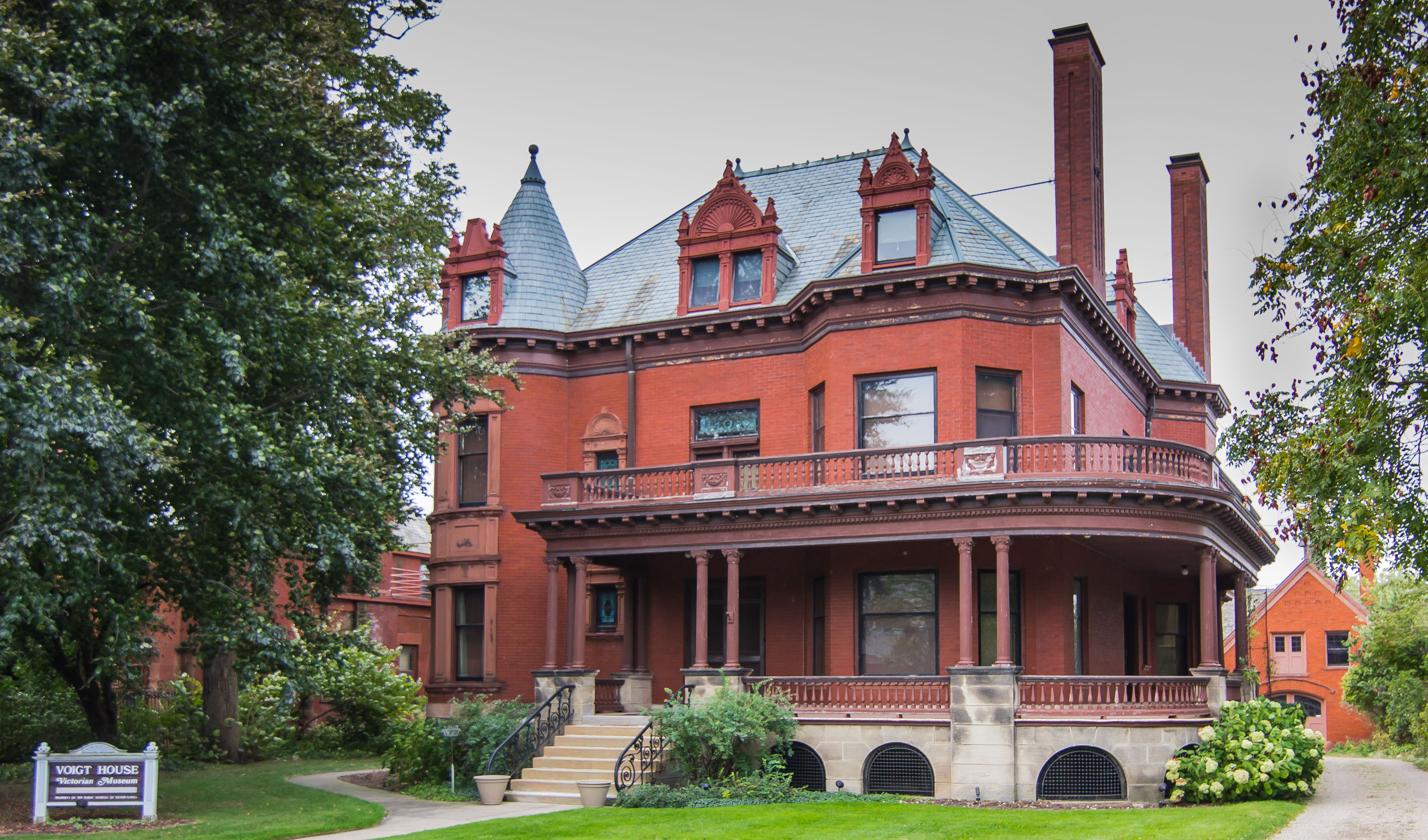
Voigt House, Part of Heritage Hill Historic District, Grand Rapids, Michigan, 1895

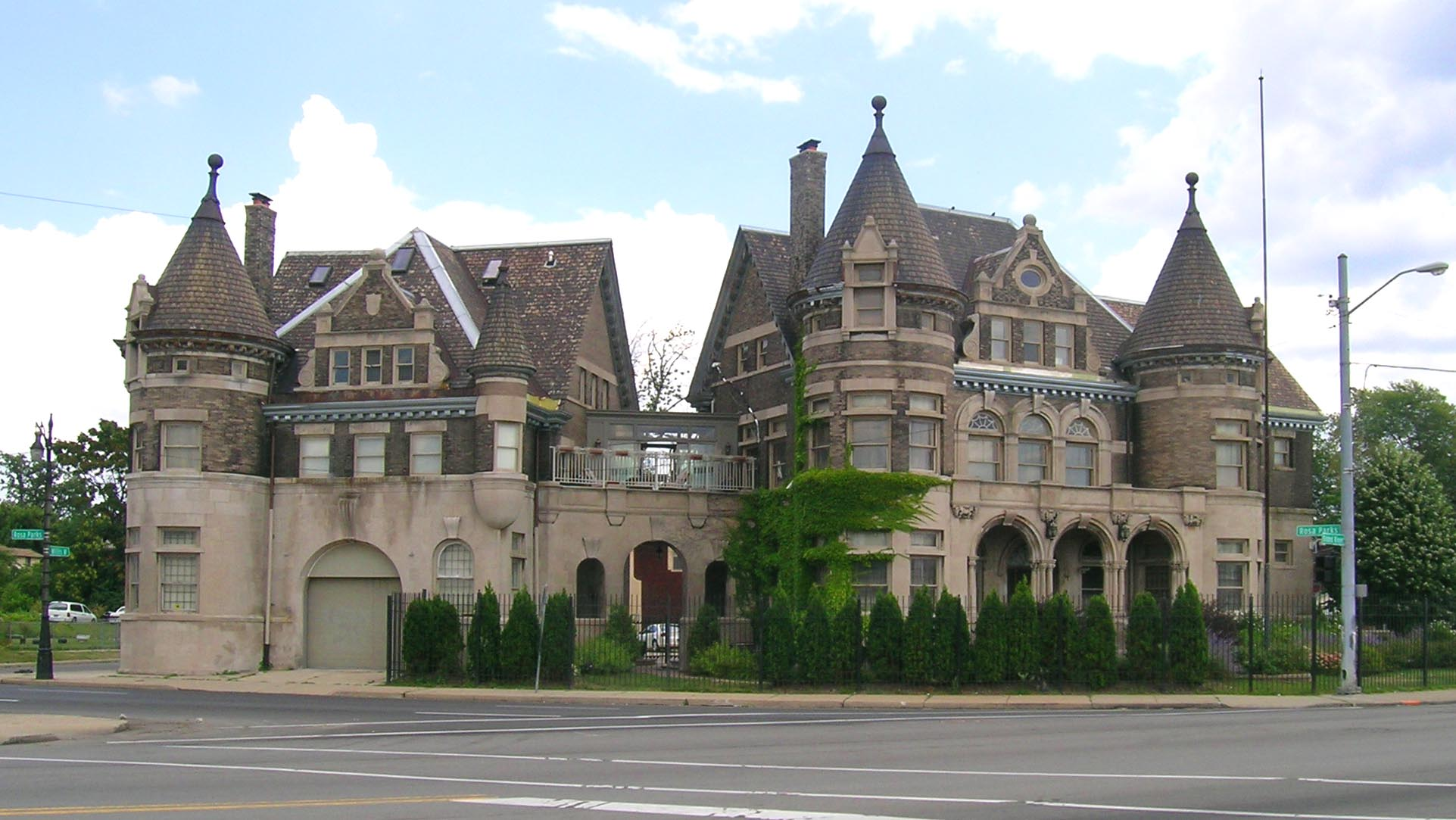
Eighth Precinct Police Station, Detroit, Michigan, 1901

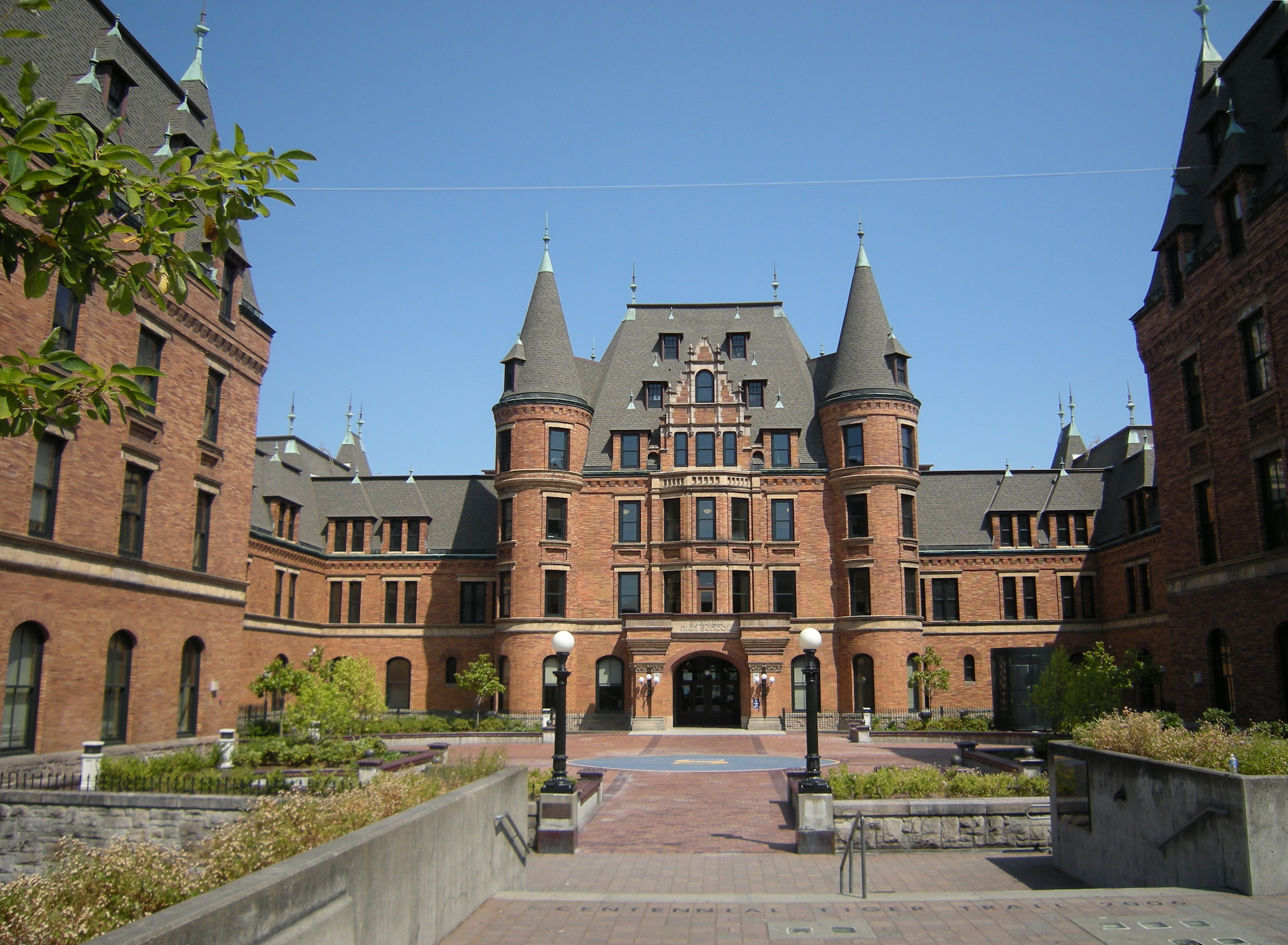
Stadium High School, Tacoma, Washington, Broke ground 1891, Completed 1906

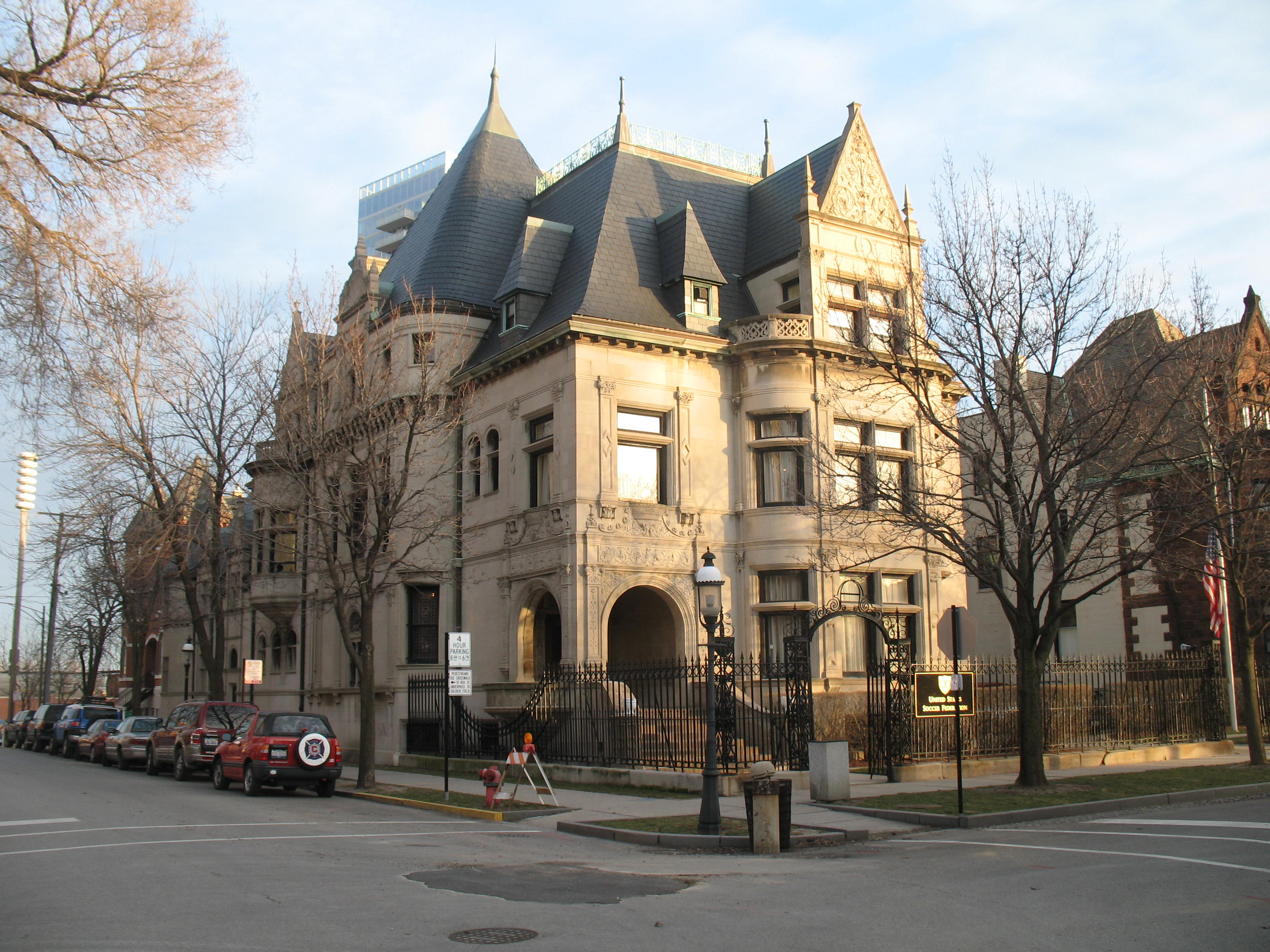
William W. Kimball House, Chicago, Illinois, 1892

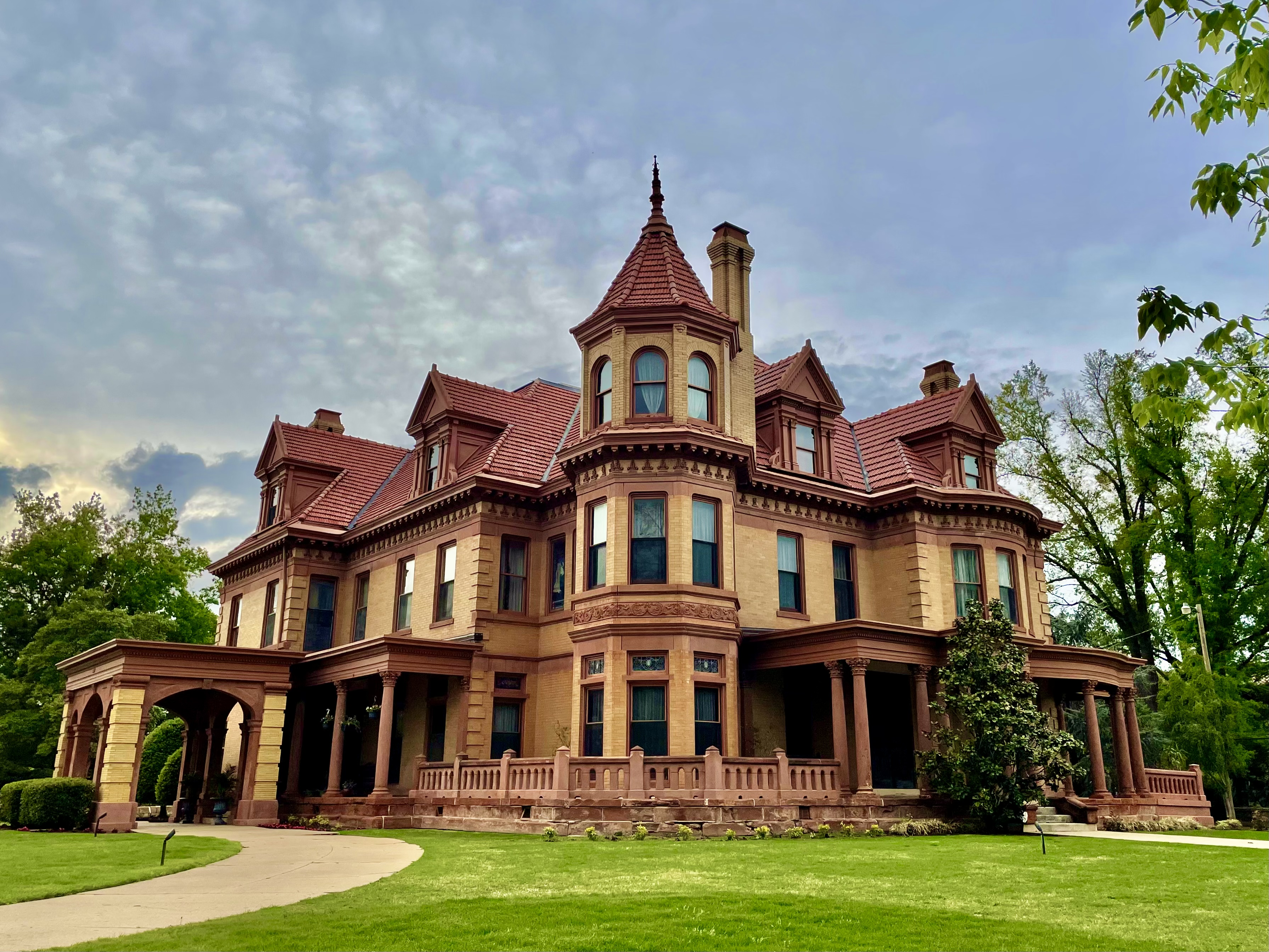
Overholser Mansion, Oklahoma City, 1903

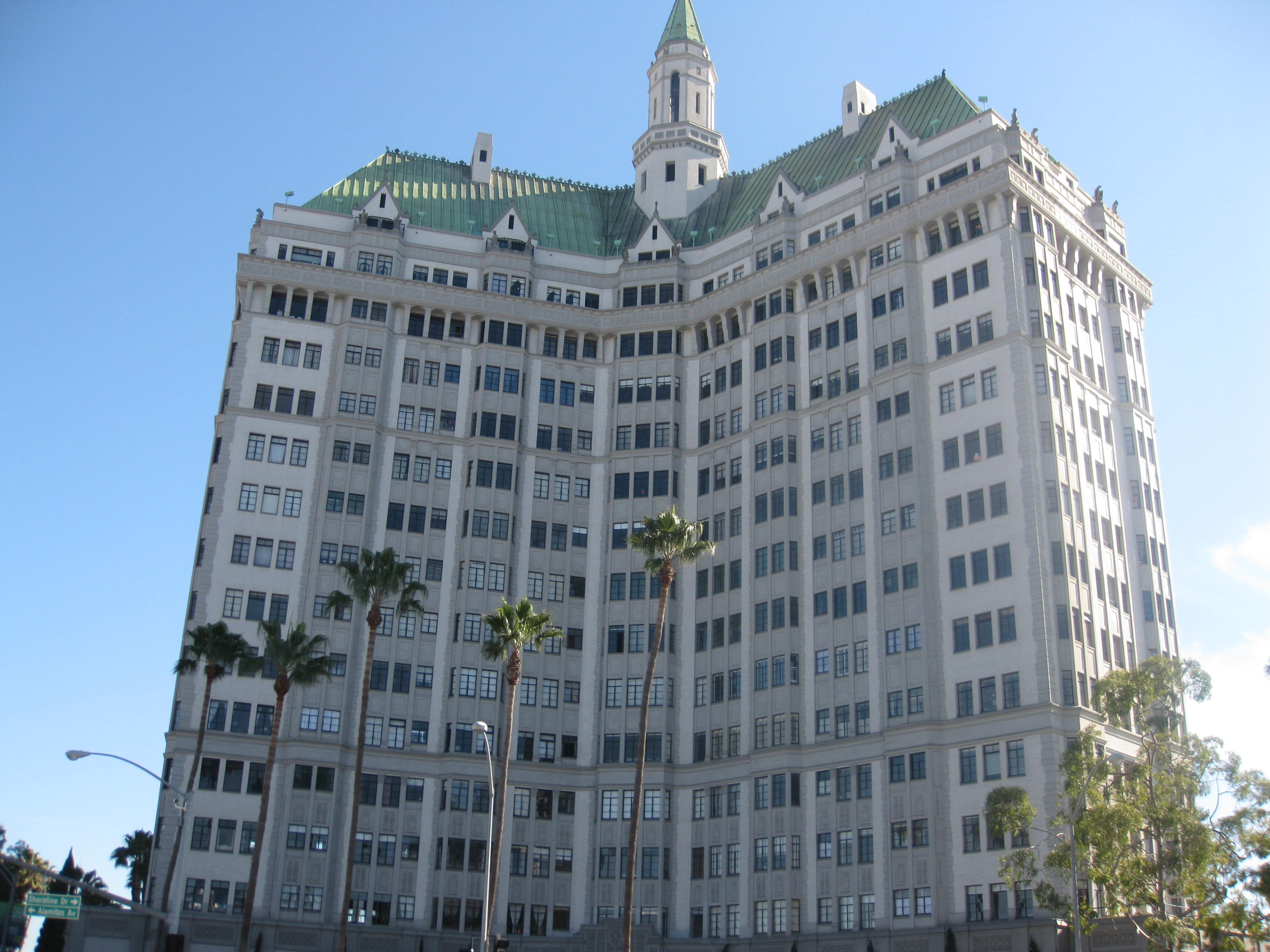
Villa Riviera, Long Beach, California, 1929

== Examples in Canada ==
Many of the Châteauesque-style buildings in Canada were built by railway companies, and their respective hotel divisions. They include Canadian National Railway and Canadian National Hotels, Canadian Pacific Railway and Canadian Pacific Hotels, and the Grand Trunk Railway.

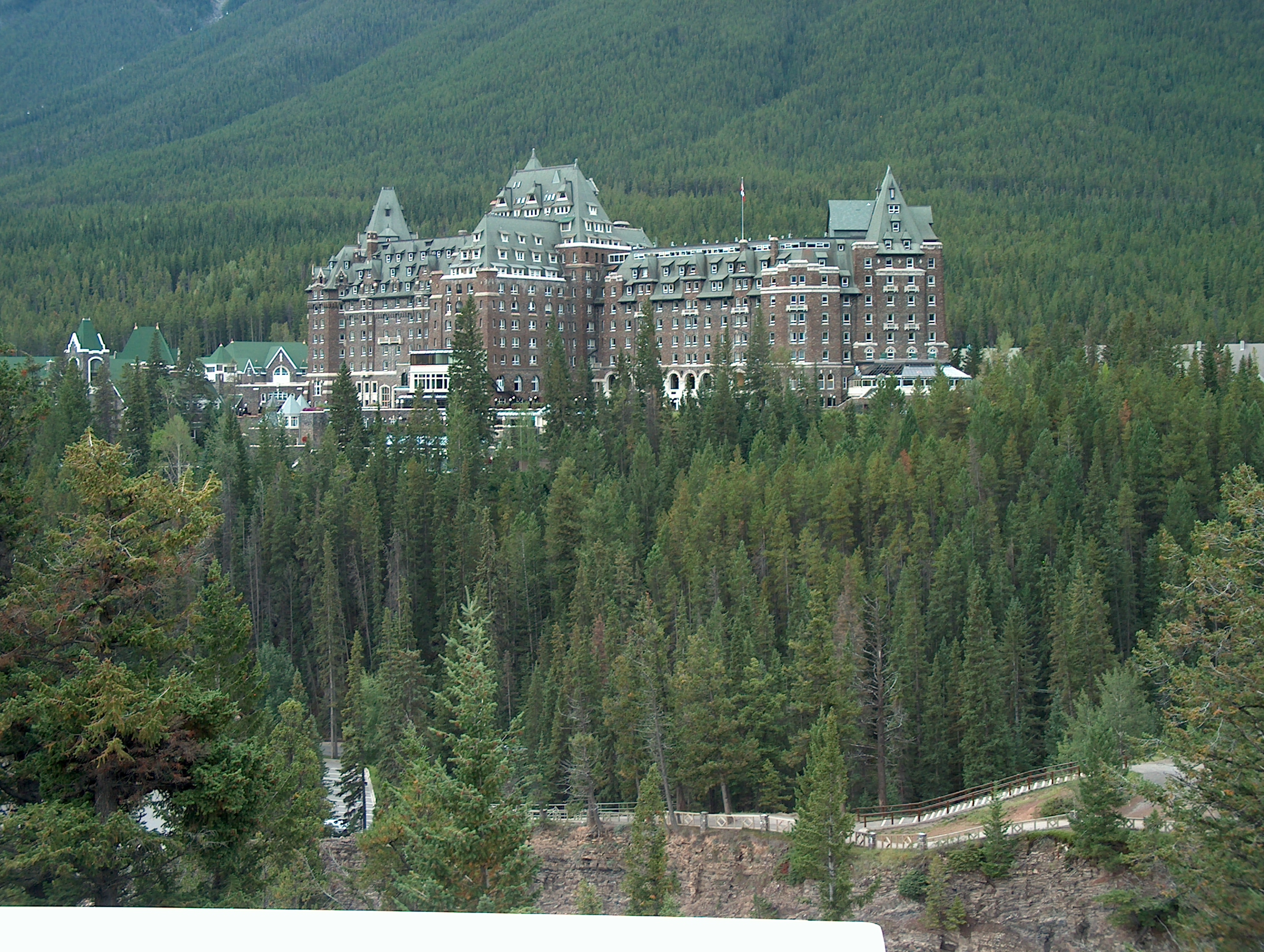
Banff Springs Hotel, Banff, Alberta

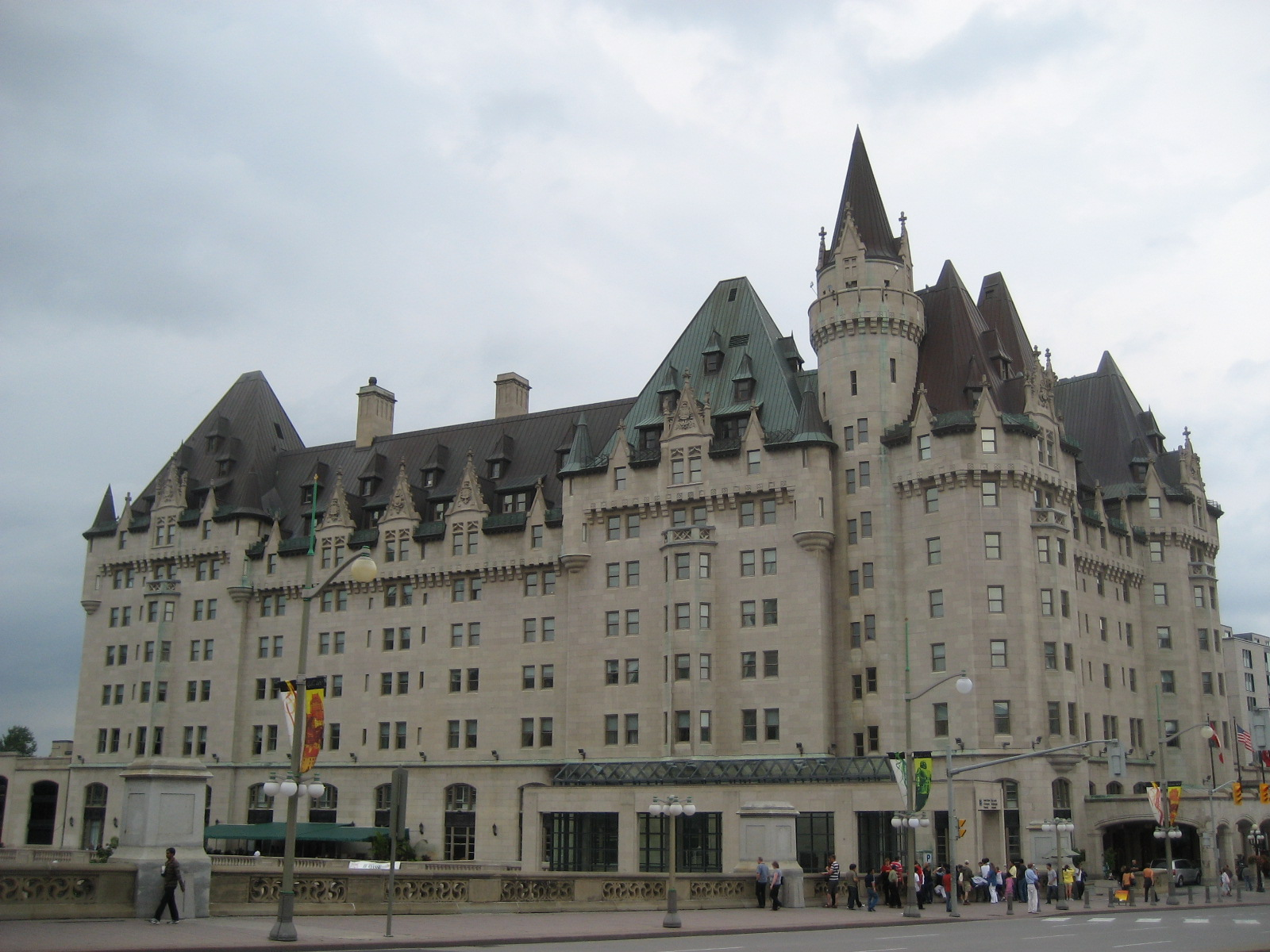
Château Laurier, Ottawa, Ontario

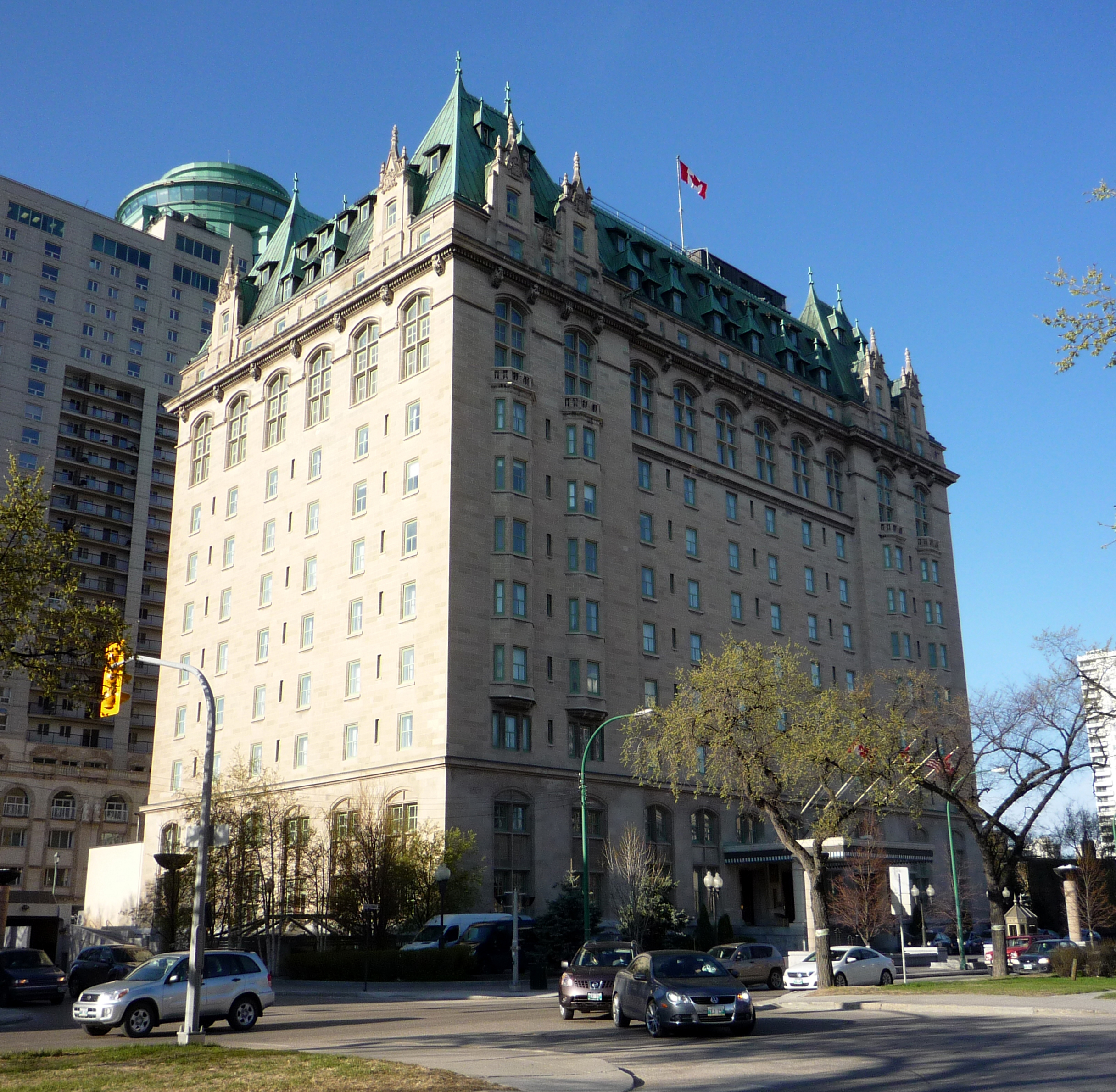
Fort Garry Hotel, Winnipeg, Manitoba

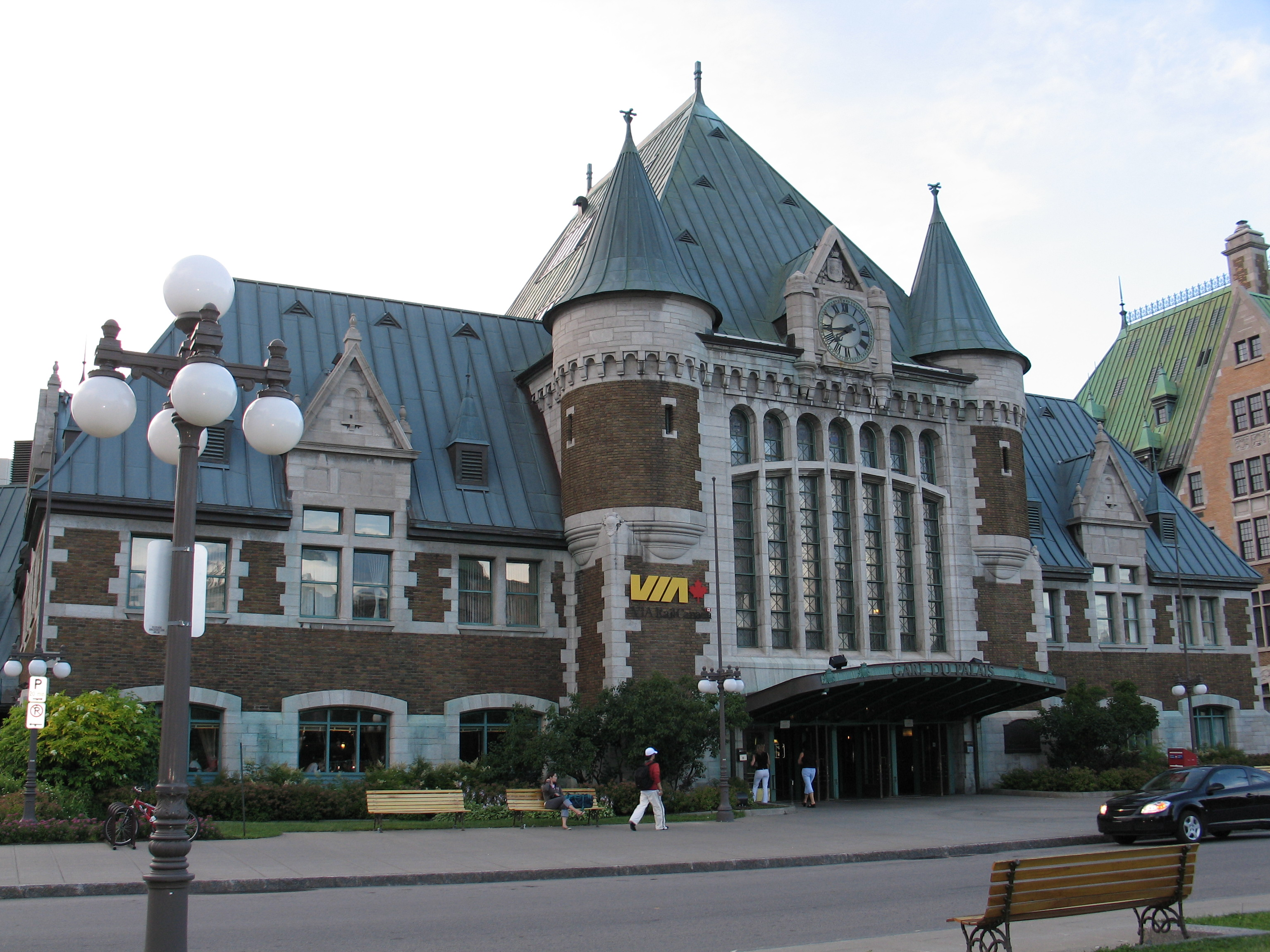
Gare du Palais, Quebec City

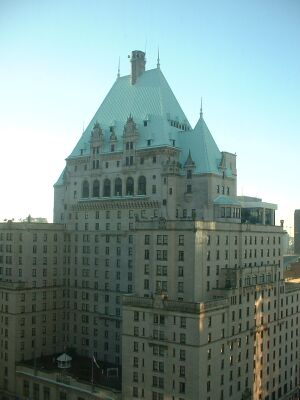
Hotel Vancouver, Vancouver, British Columbia

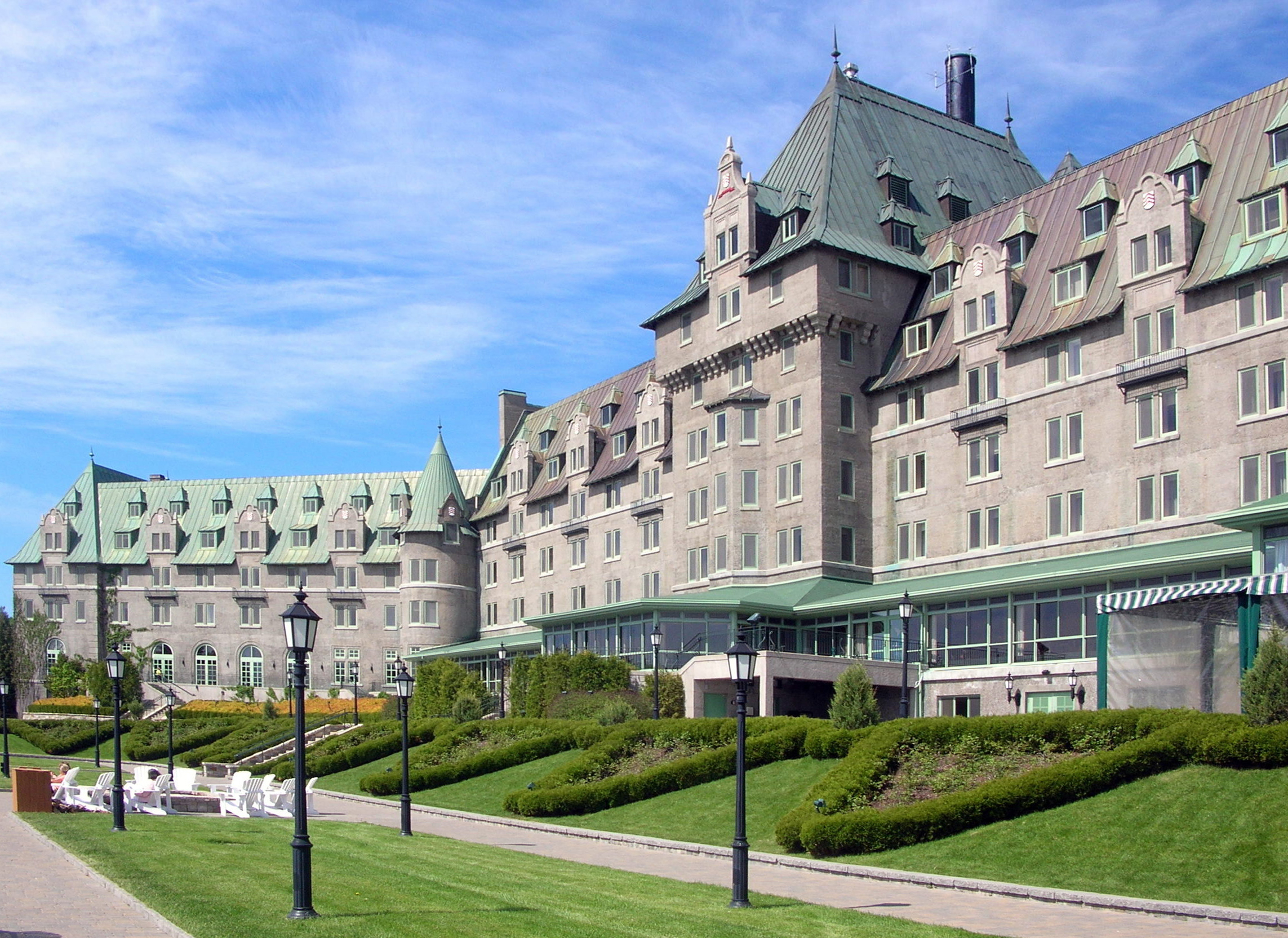
Manoir Richelieu, La Malbaie, Quebec

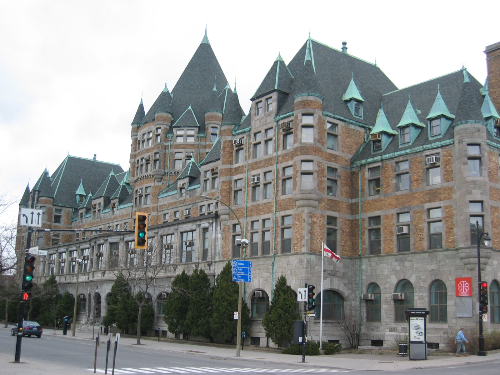
Place Viger, Montreal, Quebec

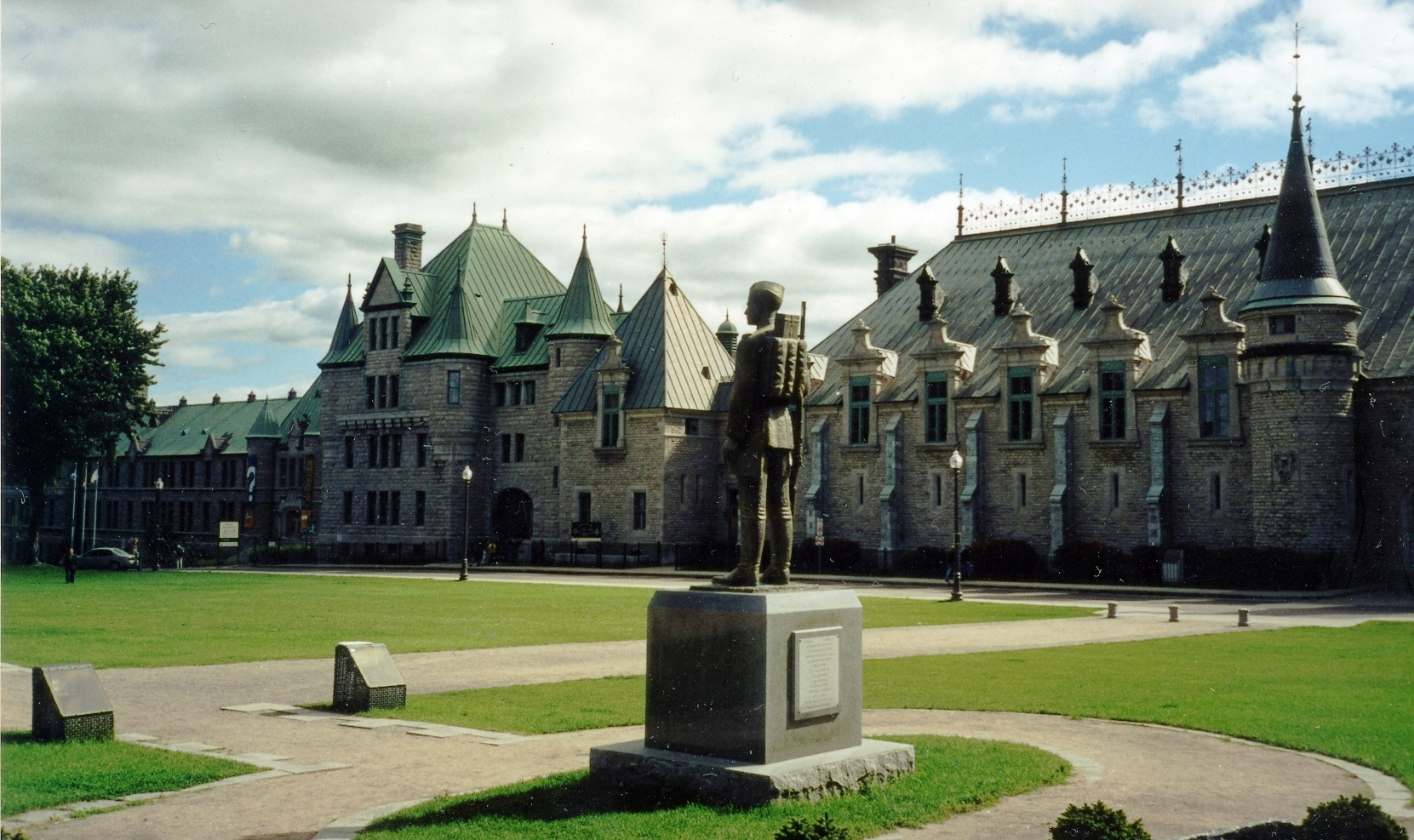
Quebec City Armoury, Quebec City

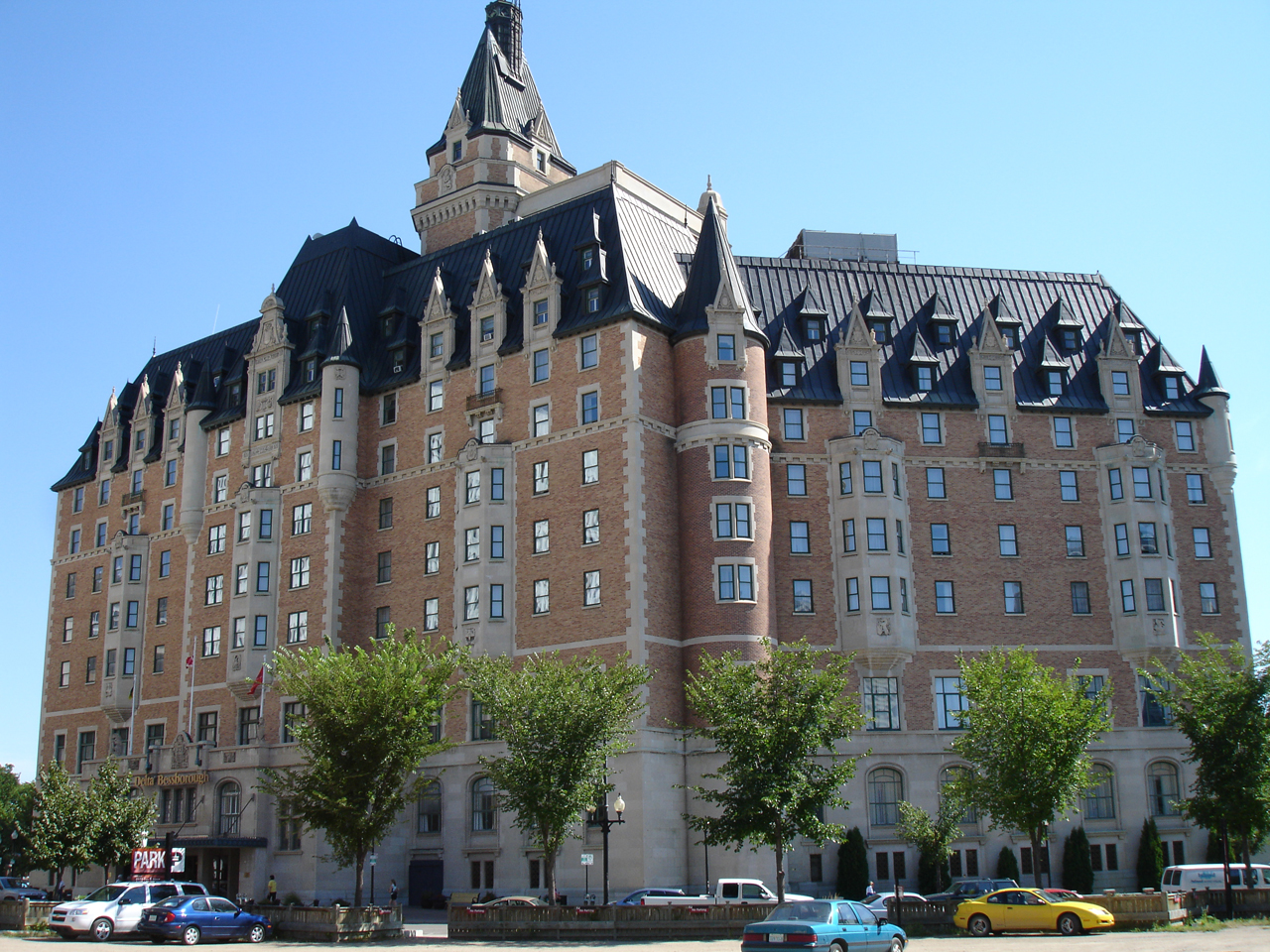
The Bessborough, Saskatoon, Saskatchewan

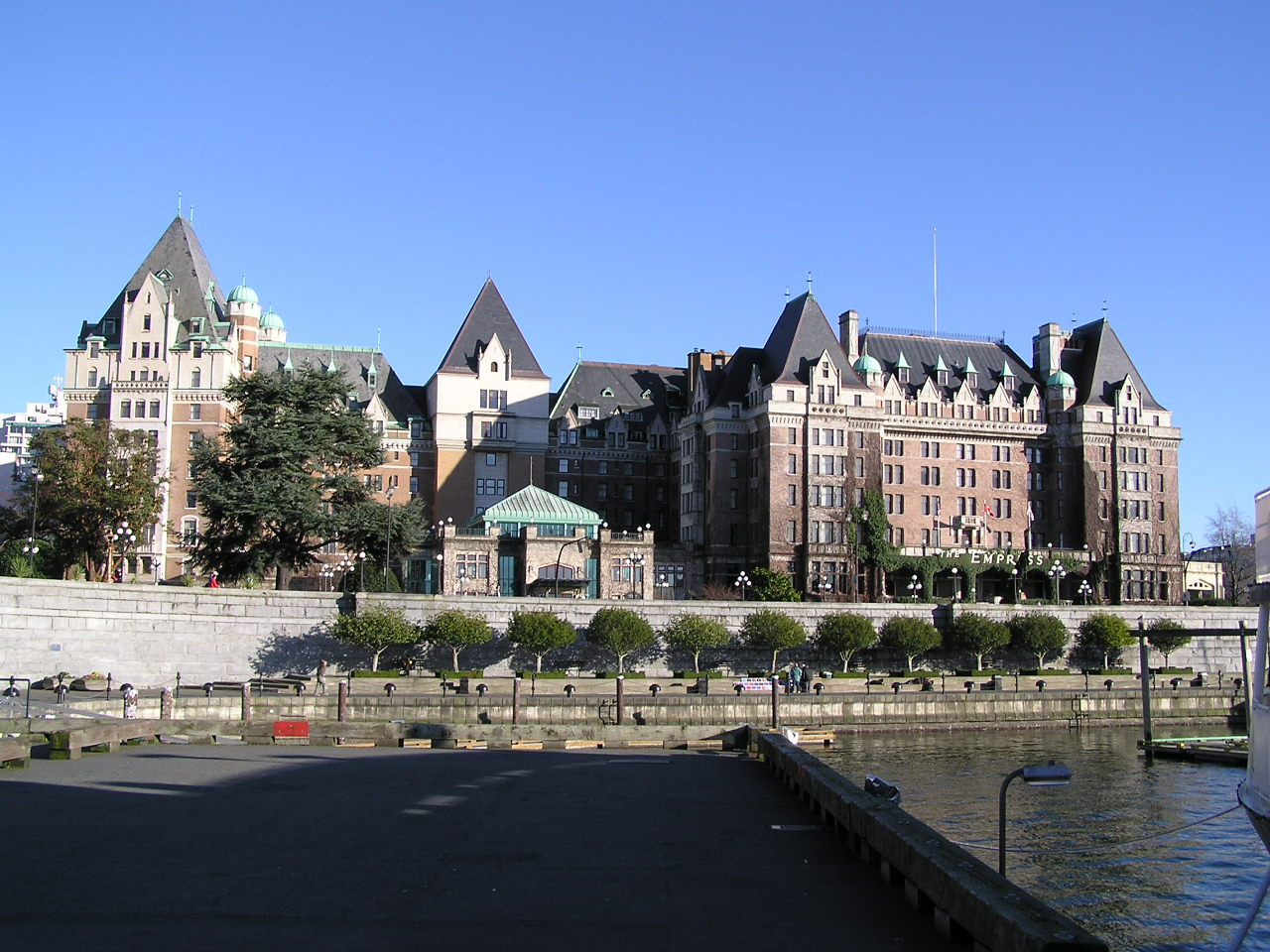
The Empress, Victoria, British Columbia

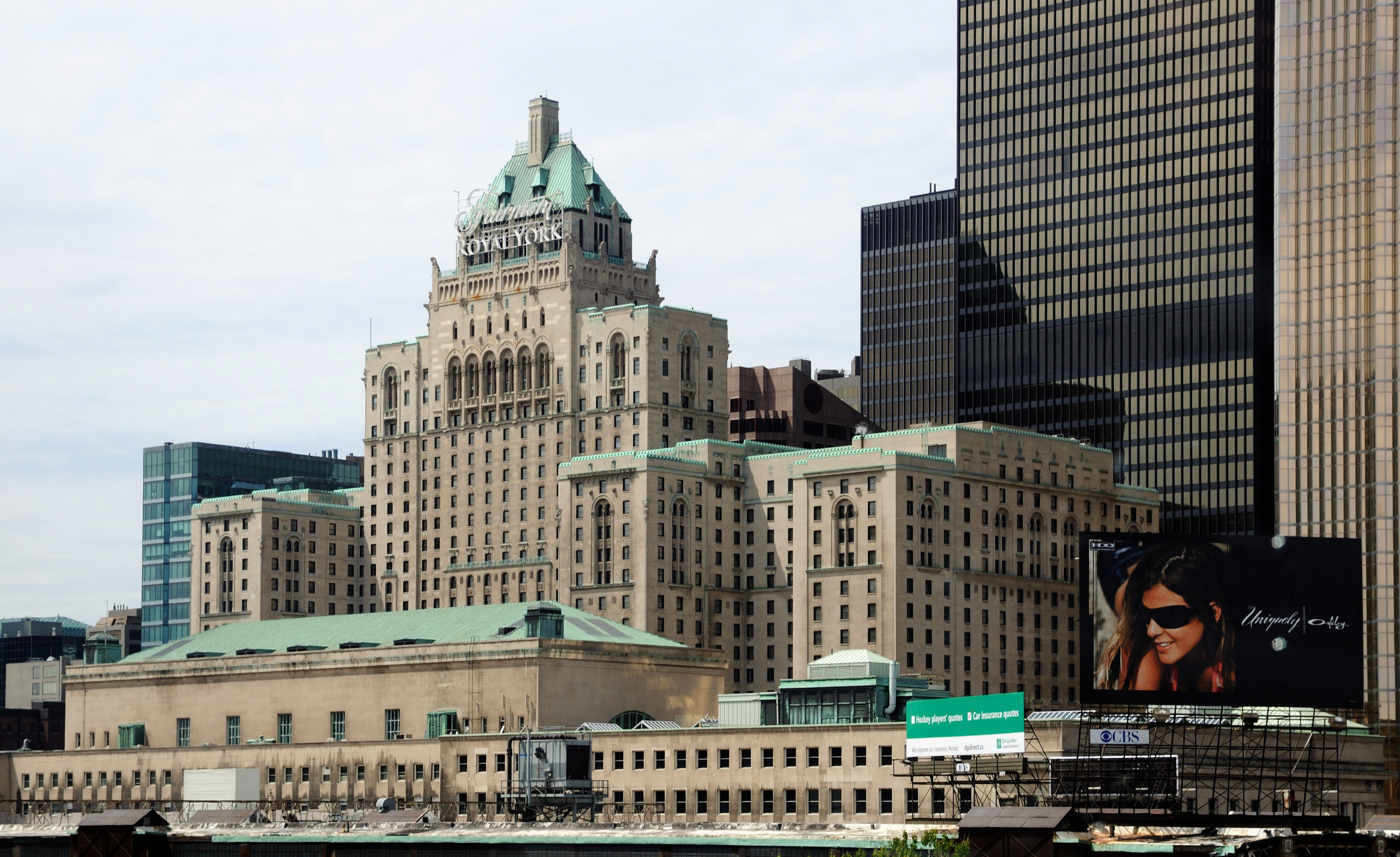
The Royal York, Toronto, Ontario

== Examples in Argentina ==
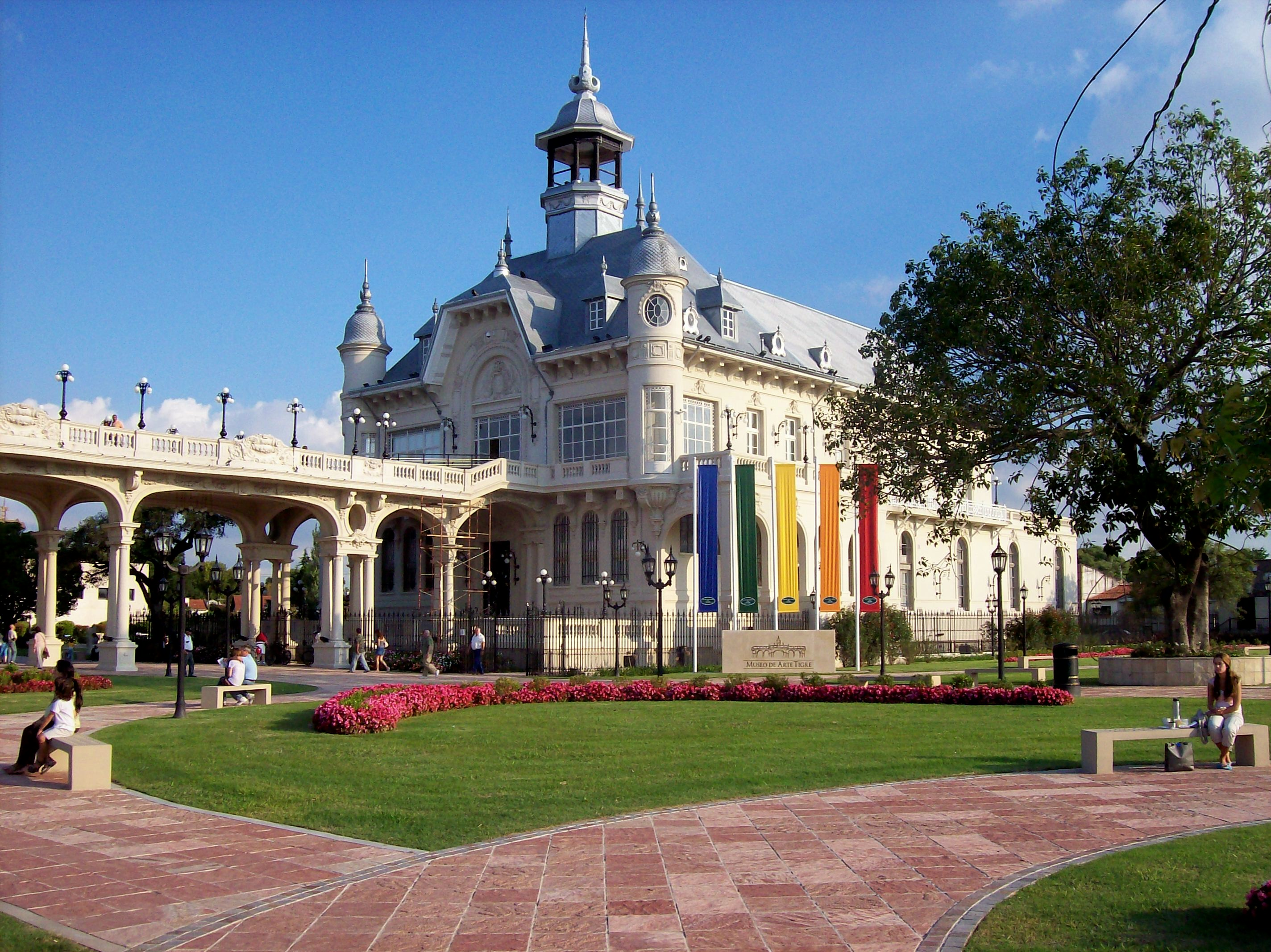
Tigre Club, Tigre

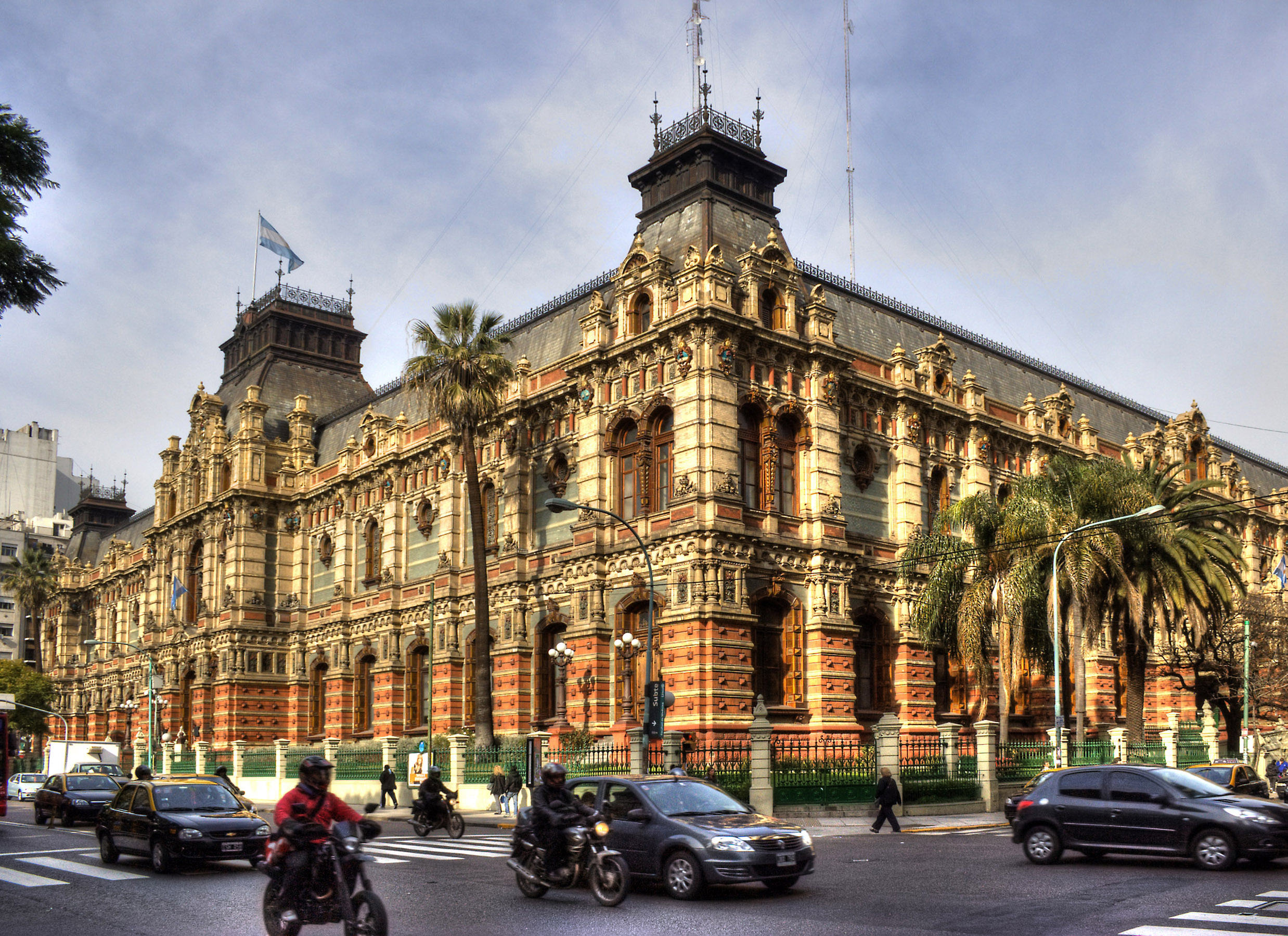
Palace of Running Waters, Buenos Aires

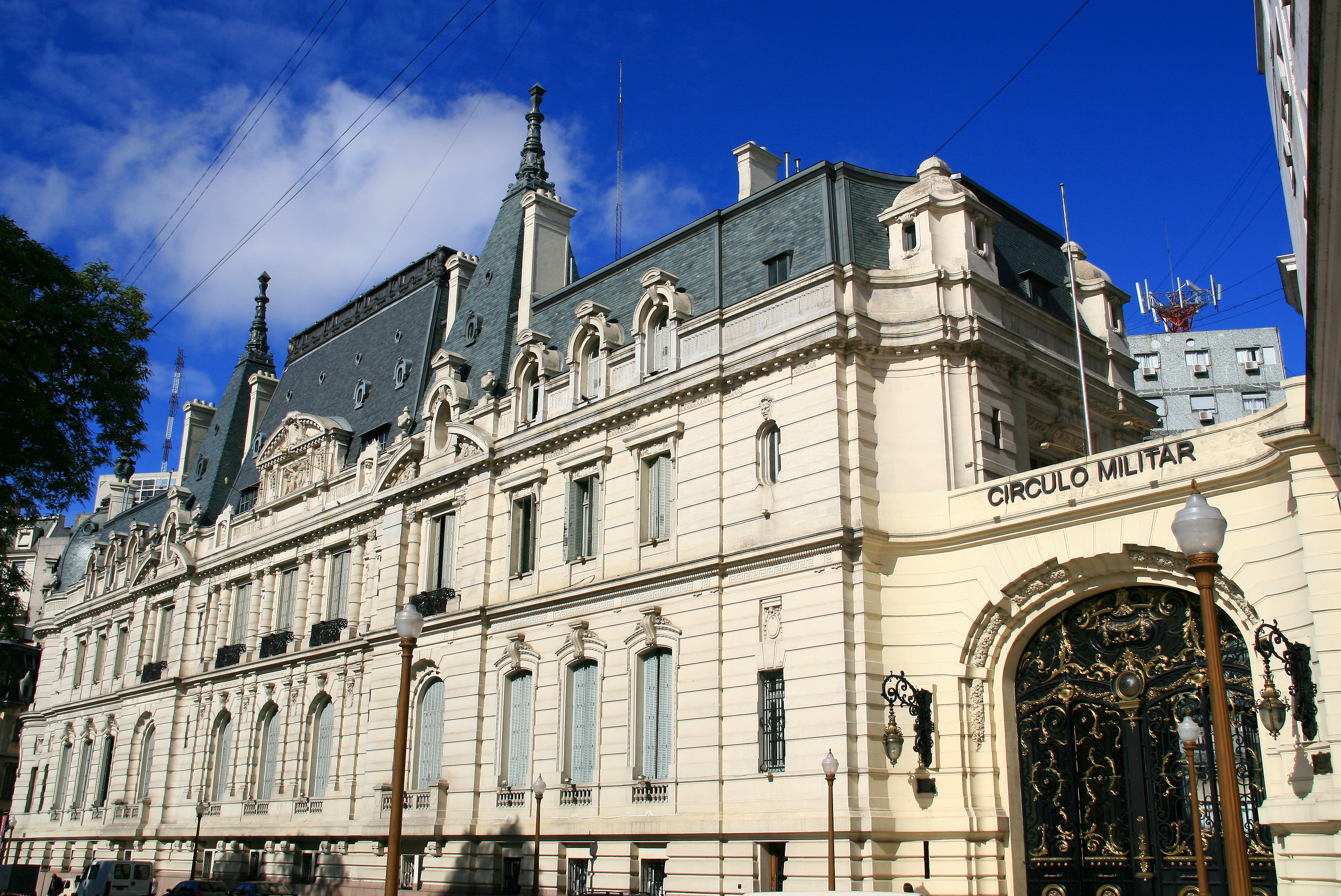
Paz Palace, Buenos Aires

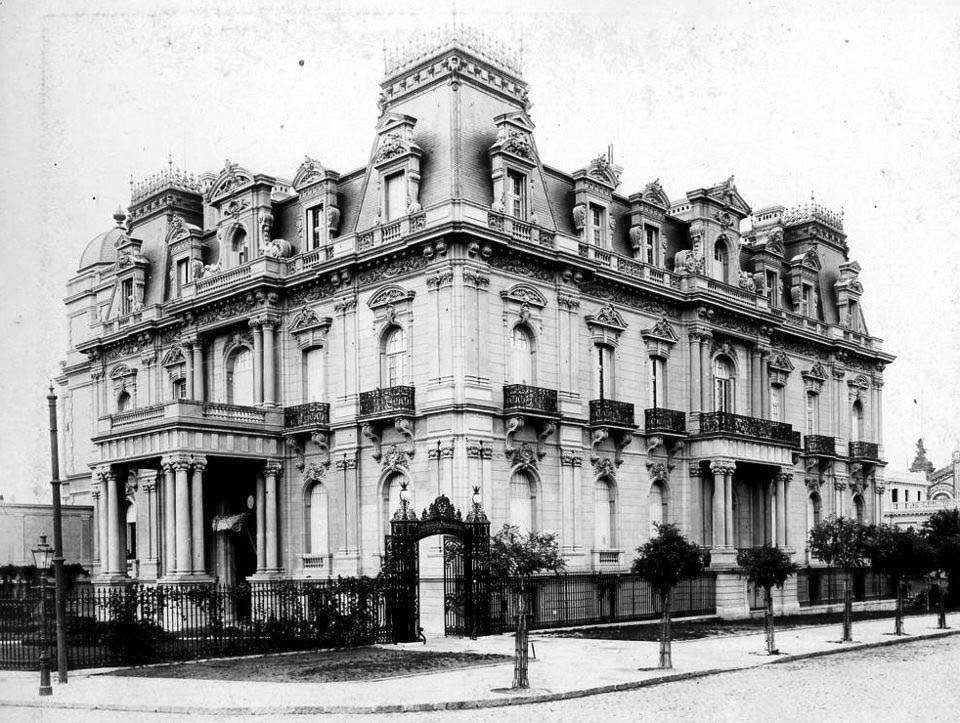
Ortiz Basualdo Palace, Buenos Aires

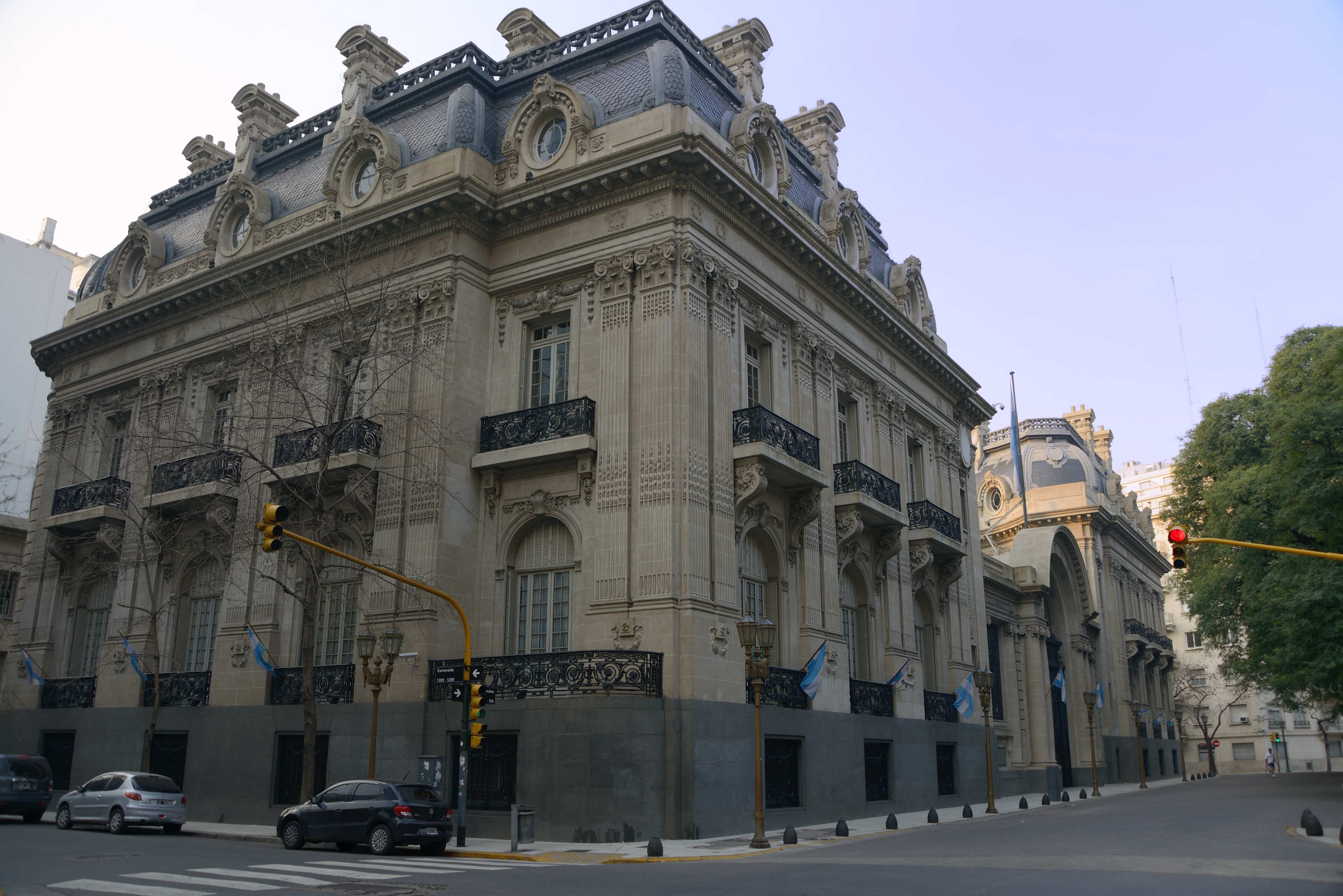
San Martín Palace, Buenos Aires

== See also ==
- List of architectural styles
- Empire style
- French architecture
- Revivalism (architecture)
