= Fort Garry Hotel =

Historical hotel in downtown Winnipeg, Canada

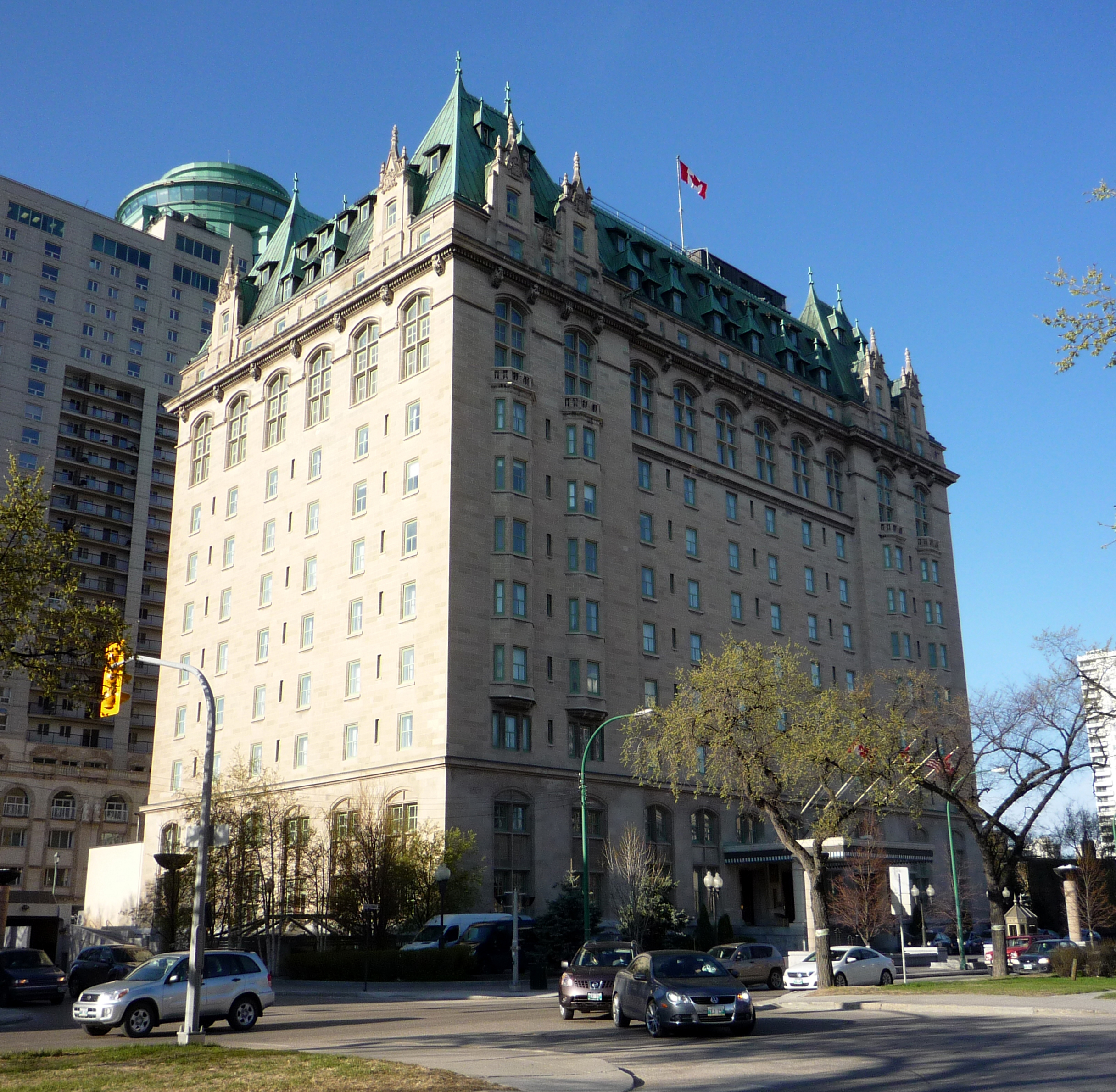
- Fort Garry Hotel in 2009
- Interactive map of the Fort Garry Hotel area

General information
- Architectural style: Châteauesque
- Location: 222 Broadway; Winnipeg, Manitoba, Canada
- Coordinates: 49°53′16″N 97°08′12″W
- Opening: December 11, 1913; 112 years ago
- Owner: Rick Bel and Ida Albo

Technical details
- Floor count: 10

Design and construction
- Architect: Ross and Macdonald
- Developer: Fuller Company
- Designations

National Historic Site of Canada
- Official name: Fort Garry Hotel National Historic Site of Canada
- Designated: 1981

Municipally Designated Site
- Designation: Winnipeg Landmark Heritage Structure
- Recognized: February 20, 1980
- CRHP listing: May 23, 2006
- Recognition authority: City of Winnipeg
- ID: 5383

Other information
- Number of rooms: 246

Website
- fortgarryhotel.com

The Fort Garry Hotel—officially the Fort Garry Hotel, Spa and Conference Centre—is an early-20th-century hotel in downtown Winnipeg, Manitoba, Canada, that opened for the first time on December 11, 1913. Built by the Grand Trunk Pacific Railway, it is one of Canada's grand railway hotels and the only surviving remnant from that era in Winnipeg.

It was designated as a National Historic Site of Canada in 1981, and as a Manitoba Provincial Heritage Site in 1990. A national heritage park connected to the hotel and to the remains of Upper Fort Garry was completed in 2017-2018.

== History ==
The Fort Garry Hotel was built between 1911 and 1913 by the Grand Trunk Pacific Railway in order to service as a luxury accommodation for upper-class railway travellers. Constructed at a strategic location on Broadway, just one block from GTPR's Union Station, the hotel was one of many hotels built by Canadian railway companies in the early 20th century to encourage tourists to travel their transcontinental routes.

Initially, the new hotel was to be called "The Selkirk Hotel" after the Selkirk Settlers, but was instead named after Upper Fort Garry, which once stood at the junction of the Red and Assiniboine Rivers.

It was designed by Montreal architects George Ross and David MacFarlane, who modelled their original plans for the hotel after Ottawa's Château Laurier; plans originally called for a 10-storey structure, but two floors were added during construction. Like the Laurier and other Canadian railway hotels, The Fort Garry was constructed in the "château style" (also termed the "neo-château" or "châteauesque" style), making it Manitoba’s only example of this architectural style.

At the time of completion, the 13-storey hotel was the tallest structure in the city. The Fort Garry Hotel opened to the public at a grand ball on 10 December 1913, what the Manitoba Free Press called an "opening ball of great brilliancy."

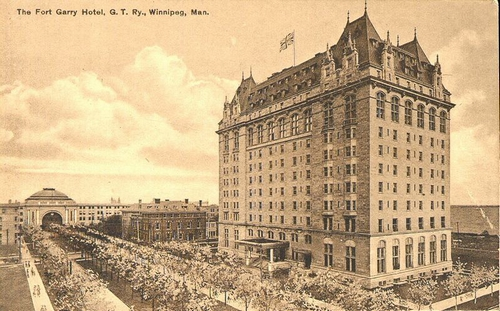
The hotel in 1913

The hotel's early prominence led it to have many famous guests, including Nelson Eddy, Harry Belafonte, Charles Laughton, Laurence Olivier, Liberace, Arthur Fiedler, Louis Armstrong, Gordie Howe, Lester Pearson, as well as King George VI and his wife Queen Elizabeth, who stayed during their 1939 royal tour of Canada.

On December 7, 1971 at 1:30 am a fire broke out on the 7th floor causing damage to the top ten floors. Of the 95 guests were evacuated, only one man was hospitalized. The blaze took 50 firefighters two hours to get under control. The first three floors of the hotel remained open.

The hotel was later owned by the Canadian National Railway after Grand Trunk was nationalized and absorbed into CN. In 1979, the hotel was purchased by the prominent John Draper Perrin family of Winnipeg, who operated it as an independent hotel until 1987.

In 1987, the hotel owed CA$2.5 million in taxes and was in "urgent need of renovations to bring it up to modern-day standards." During this time, the hotel was briefly owned by the City of Winnipeg, before being acquired in early 1988 by a company controlled by Quebec hotelier Raymond Malenfant. The company purchased the hotel for $1 million with the promise of spending $12 million to renovate it. The hotel reopened in mid-1988 with a black-tie soiree of 750 guests.

In the 1990s, the hotel converted its two ballrooms into a provincial government-run casino, called the Crystal Casino. The casino only operated for approximately 10 years, as the hotel's owners urged the government to remove it.

In 2009, the hotel came under new ownership and was rebranded as the Fort Garry Hotel, Spa and Conference Centre.

In August 2020, The Fort Garry became part of Choice Hotels' Ascend Collection, under managing partners Richard Bel and Ida Albo, along with the Laberge Group out of Quebec City.

=== Folklore ===
According to local folklore, the hotel (specifically room 202) is haunted by a female spirit. A woman apparently died by suicide in the room many years ago after hearing of the death of her husband in a car accident. Overcome with grief, she hanged herself in the closet. There is no documentation to support this, no newspaper articles report a woman's death in the hotel. The tale changed over time, from being a man found dead to a woman dying by suicide.

=== CNR Radio ===
The Fort Garry Hotel was the site of the Winnipeg studio of CNR Radio, the precursor to CBC Radio, between 1923 and 1932, using the original CKY transmitter on 665 kHz, moving to 780 kHz in 1925. CNR purchased time on stations they did not own, called "phantom" stations.

== See also ==
- Ida Albo, managing partner
- Fort Garry
