= Ida Albo =

Canadian businesswoman

Ida Albo is a Canadian businesswoman and the owner and managing partner of the Fort Garry Hotel in Winnipeg, Manitoba.

== Career ==
Albo has served as co-president of the CentreVenture Development Corporation. She is on the board of directors of the University of Winnipeg Foundation, and was BA (Hons.), Class of '81. She is the vice chair of the board of directors at the Pan Am Clinic Foundation. In February 2012, Albo opened Yoga Public, a 20,000 square foot yoga facility, in Winnipeg. She is the chair of the Guardian Angel Benefit Committee for the Cancer Care Manitoba Foundation. She has also served as a board member of the Tourism Association of Winnipeg, the Canadian Tourism Commission, the Health Sciences Centre Research Foundation, Citizens Against Impaired Driving, and the Pan Am Clinic Foundation.

She was named a Member of the Order of Canada in 2015 for "unwavering commitment to the well-being of her community."

In 2023 and 2024, she attended fundraising dinners for Canadian Conservative Party Leader Pierre Poilievre, hosted by Winnipeg Businessman Tom De Nardi.
