= Swissôtel Zürich =

Hotel in Zürich

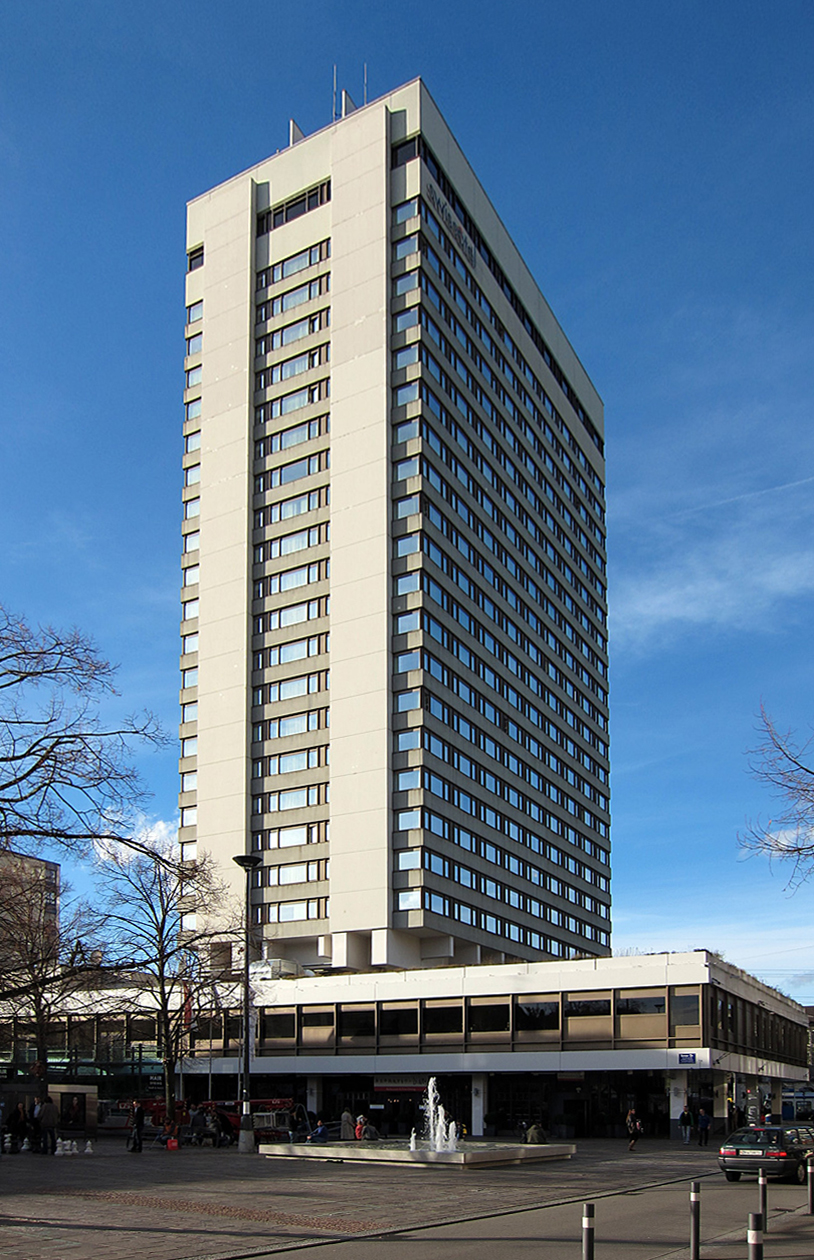
- Swissôtel Zürich
- Interactive map of the Swissôtel Zürich area

General information
- Location: Schulstrasse 44, 8050 Zurich, Switzerland
- Coordinates: 47.410879°N 8.543724°E
- Opening: 1972
- Management: Swissôtel Hotels & Resorts

Height
- Height: 85 metres (279 ft)

Other information
- Number of rooms: 350
- Number of restaurants: 1

Website
- www.swissotel.com

The Swissôtel Zürich, formerly known as the Hotel International Zürich, was a luxury hotel in the Swiss city of Zürich. The hotel was located in the Oerlikon quarter of the city, directly opposite Zürich Oerlikon railway station, and roughly halfway between the city centre and Zurich Airport.

The hotel was part of the chain managed by Swissôtel Hotels & Resorts, which is based in Zürich and is part of the FRHI Hotels & Resorts group. It had 350 guest rooms and a height of 85 metres (279 ft), making it the tallest hotel in Zürich.

As well as hotel and conference facilities, the hotel contained a bar and restaurant (Le Muh), a branch of the Starbucks coffee chain, a hairdresser and a confectionery shop.

== History ==
The hotel was designed by Fred A. Widmer and built by Karl Steiner AG. It opened in 1972, as the Hotel International Zürich. In 1980 a management contract with Swissôtel Hotels & Resorts, founded by Swissair and Nestlé, was signed. Since then, the hotel has officially been called the Swissôtel Zürich.

On St Valentine's Day (February 14) of 1988, there was a major fire in the hotel, which resulted in the deaths of four guests and two members of staff. The fire originated in the Panorama Grill on the 31st floor of the hotel, and was caused by self-ignition while refilling an alcohol-fuelled food heater. The consequences of the fire were made worse because the fire disabled the fire lift, forcing the fire brigade to hand carry all their equipment up to the seat of the fire. After the fire, the restaurant was replaced with meeting and event rooms.

In 2011, the restaurants Szenario und Dialog and the Edison Bar closed down after more than 20 years of operation. After a three-month renovation period, the new Le Muh restaurant opened. In November 2014, the hotel's main lobby was renovated with a new modern-inspired design

On August 26, 2013, the building was put on the inventory list of Zürich's city council for historic preservation.

The hotel closed in November 2020, due to the economic impact of the COVID-19 pandemic and was converted to student dorms.
