= Swissôtel Büyük Efes =

Coordinates: 38°25′41″N 27°8′9″E

The Swissôtel Büyük Efes (formerly known as Büyük Efes Hotel) is a hotel located near Cumhuriyet Square in İzmir, Turkey. It is part of the Swissôtel Hotels & Resorts chain.

== History ==
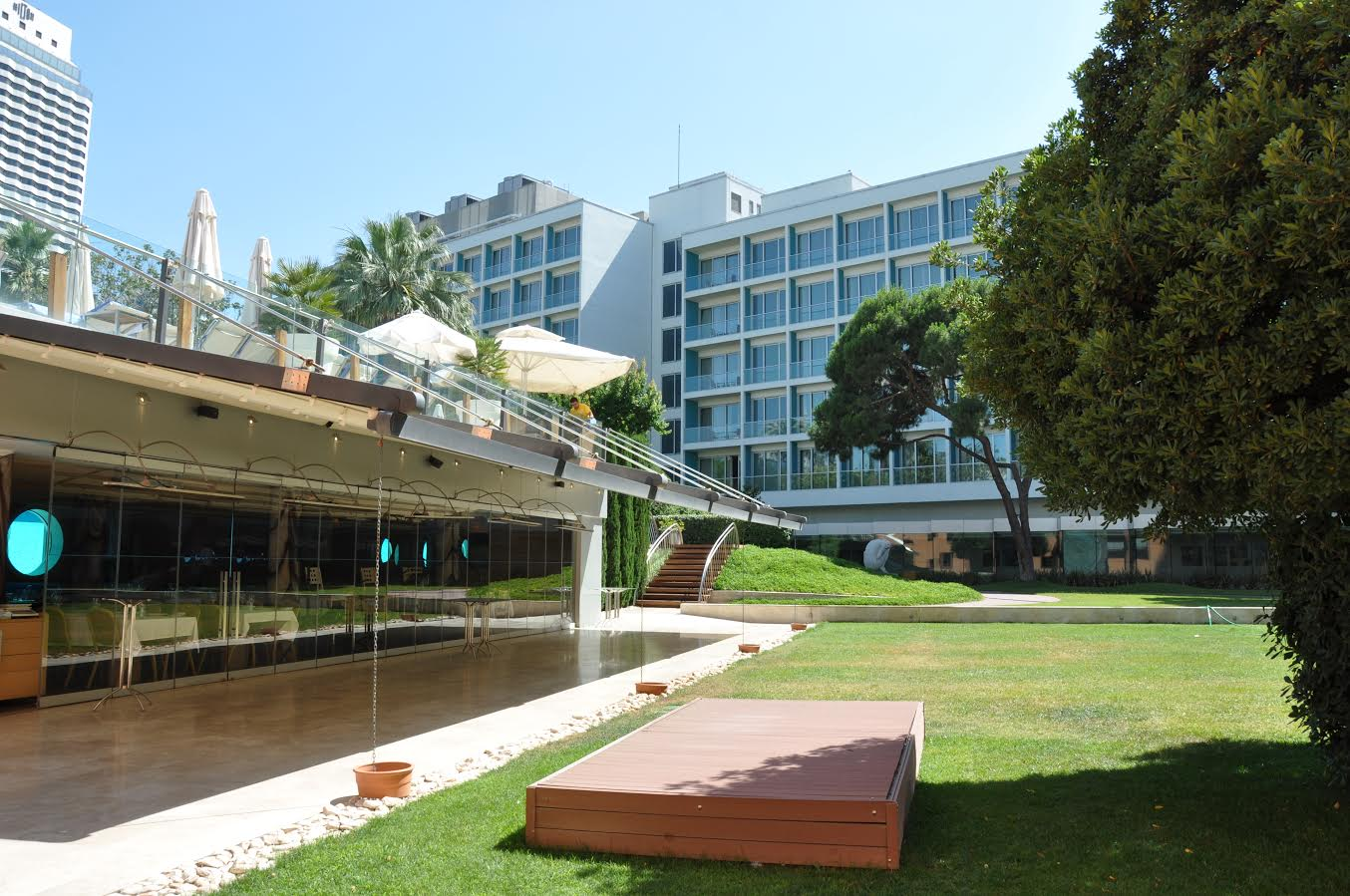
Garden of the hotel

The initial design of the hotel was prepared by architect Paul Bonatz in 1950, but was soon discontinued due to the architect's health problems. The project was soon reassigned to and completed by Turkish architect Fatih Uran. The hotel opened officially in 1964.

The hotel was originally owned by The Pension Fund (Emekli Sandığı). In 2003 a new architectural project for the hotel was prepared by HAS Architecture and NBBJ (a global American architecture firm). In May 2008, the hotel reopened as Swissôtel Büyük Efes.

The hotel is located near Cumhuriyet Square, which was constructed after the great fire of Smyrna in 1922. The famous Atatürk Monument is situated in the square.
