= Raffles Holdings =

Raffles Holdings was the parent company of Raffles International, owned by Temasek Holdings which is the investment arm of the Singapore government.

In 2005, Raffles Holdings' hotel business ranked 17th or 18th in the world in terms of market capitalization and number of rooms, all marketed under the Raffles and Swissôtel brand names.

== History ==
The company was incorporated on 26 August 1995.

On 18 July 2005, Raffles Holdings announced its sale to Colony Capital, LLC for about US$1 billion, including outstanding debt. The deal, worth 1.72 billion Singapore dollars, included all 41 hotels and resorts. Its most prominent establishment was the luxurious 103-suite Raffles Hotel in Singapore, built in 1887.

CapitaLand Ltd., Southeast Asia's largest property developer that owned 59.7 percent of Raffles Holdings, would gain the equivalent of US$362 million from the sale and plans to pay shareholders a special dividend of 23 U.S. cents a share. The cash price for the hotels was 1.45 billion Singapore dollars, or US$859 million.

SGX: R03
