= Swissôtel Nankai Osaka =

Hotel in Chuo-ku, Osaka, Osaka Prefecture, Japan

Coordinates: 34°39′50″N 135°30′04″E

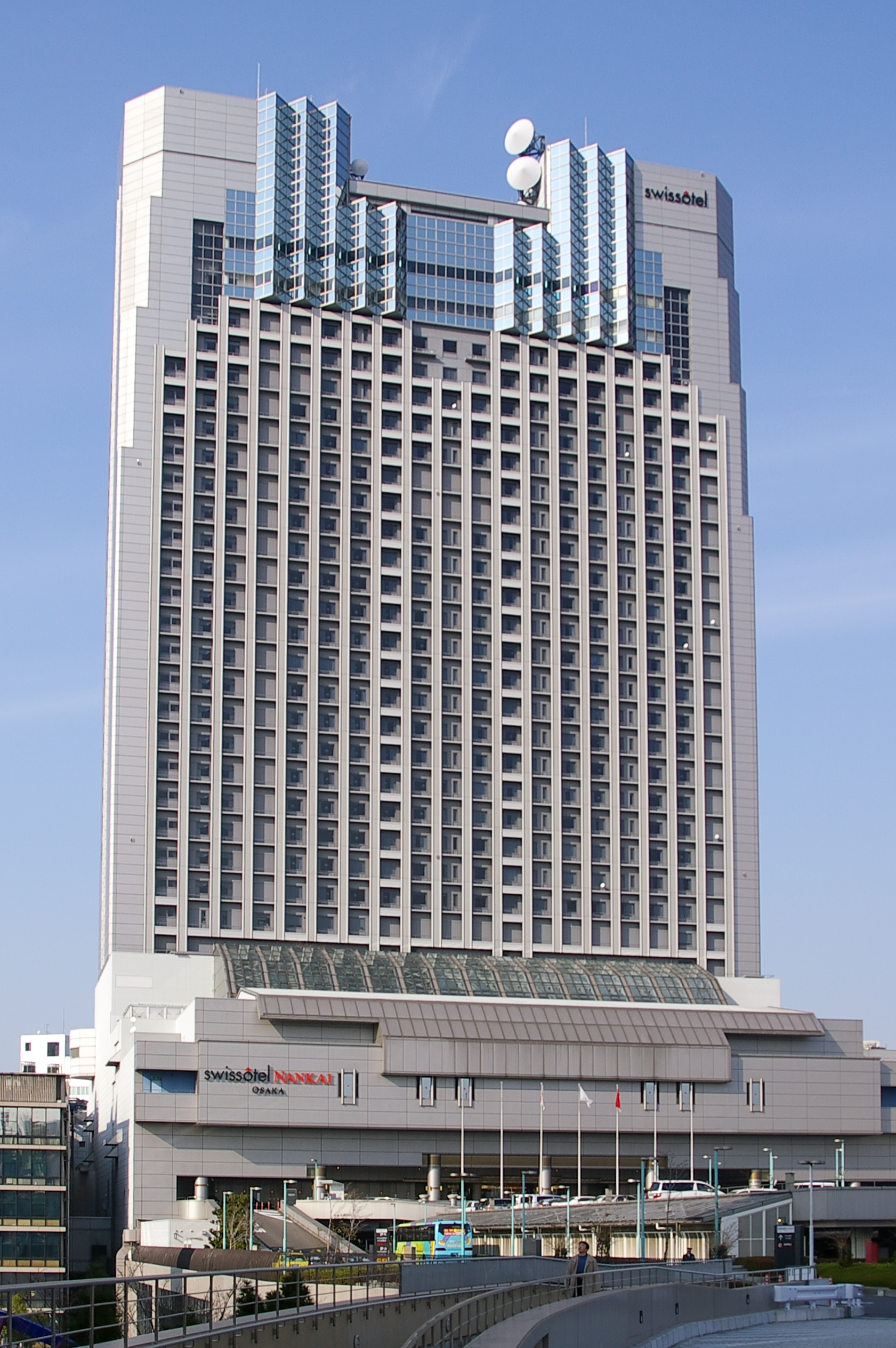
- Exterior of Swissôtel Nankai Osaka
- Hotel chain: Swissôtel Hotels & Resorts

General information
- Location: Osaka, Japan, 5-1-60 Namba, Chuo-ku, Osaka
- Opening: March 1990
- Owner: Nankai Electric Railway Co., Ltd.
- Operator: AccorHotels

Height
- Height: 147 metres (482 ft)

Technical details
- Floor count: 36

Other information
- Number of rooms: 546
- Number of suites: 28
- Number of restaurants: 8
- Parking: 357

Website
- www.swissotel.com/hotels/nankai-osaka

Swissôtel Nankai Osaka (スイスホテル南海大阪) is a hotel situated directly above Namba Station on the Nankai Railway lines in Chūō-ku, Osaka, Japan. The hotel is owned by Nankai Electric Railway Co., Ltd., and managed by the Switzerland-based hotel chain Swissôtel Hotels & Resorts.

== History ==
The hotel originally opened in March 1990, as Nankai South Tower Hotel Osaka (南海サウスタワーホテル大阪). The building stands 36 floors (with three more floors below ground), and 147 metres (482 ft) high.

In 2003, Raffles Hotels and Resorts signed a deal with Nankai Electric Railway to operate the Nankai South Tower Hotel. As a result of this deal, the property's name was changed to Swissôtel Nankai Osaka, and it became the first Swissôtel Hotels and Resorts property in Japan. Swissôtel Nankai Osaka commemorated its 10th anniversary in 2013.

In 2016, AccorHotels acquired FRHI Hotels & Resorts, Swissôtel Nankai Osaka become the upper and luxury tier property of AccorHotels in Japan.
