= Atatürk Monument (İzmir) =

Monument in İzmir, Turkey

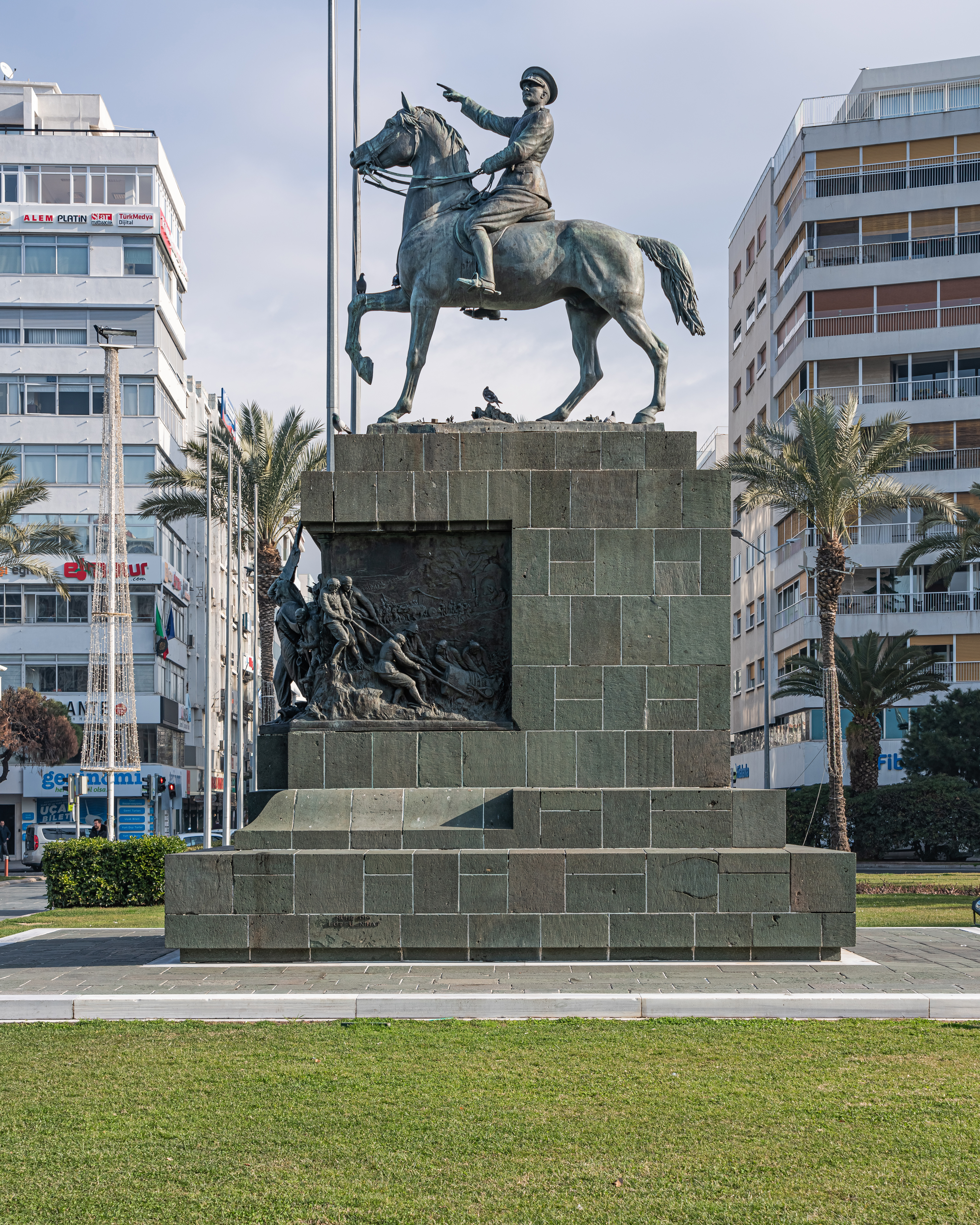
- Interactive map of Atatürk Monument
- Location: İzmir, Turkey
- Coordinates: 38°25′45″N 27°08′04″E
- Designer: Pietro Canonica; Asım Kömürcü
- Type: Equestrian statue
- Material: Bronze
- Opening date: 27 July 1932

Atatürk Monument is a monument in İzmir, Turkey dedicated to the Turkish War of Independence depicting equestrian Mustafa Kemal Atatürk.

== Geography ==
The monument is in the Cumhuriyet Sqıare (“Republic square”) in İzmir. at 38°25′45″N 27°08′04″E. The square is located in the seaside and the monument is located about 60 metres (200 ft) to southeast of the İzmir Bay (i.e., Aegean Sea).

== History ==
The municipality and governorship of İzmir decided to build a monument dedicated to Atatürk, the founder of modern Turkey. In 1929, the statue of the monument was commissioned to Pietro Canonica an Italian sculptor who had formerly created another Atatürk statue in İstanbul in 1928. The base of the statue was designed by Turkish architect Asım Kömürcü and the statue was erected on 27 July 1932.

== Technical details ==
The marble used in the base is the red marble of Afyonkarahisar and the material of the statue is bronze. The statue shows equestrian Atatürk in the Turkish War of Independence. There are also reliefs on the base showing scenes of war. Atatürk’s famous quotation “Armies your first target is the Mediterranean Sea. Forward!” has been inscribed in front of the base marble.

== See also ==
- Atatürk monuments and memorials
