= Oerlikon (Zurich) =

Quarter of Zürich, Switzerland

- Quarter
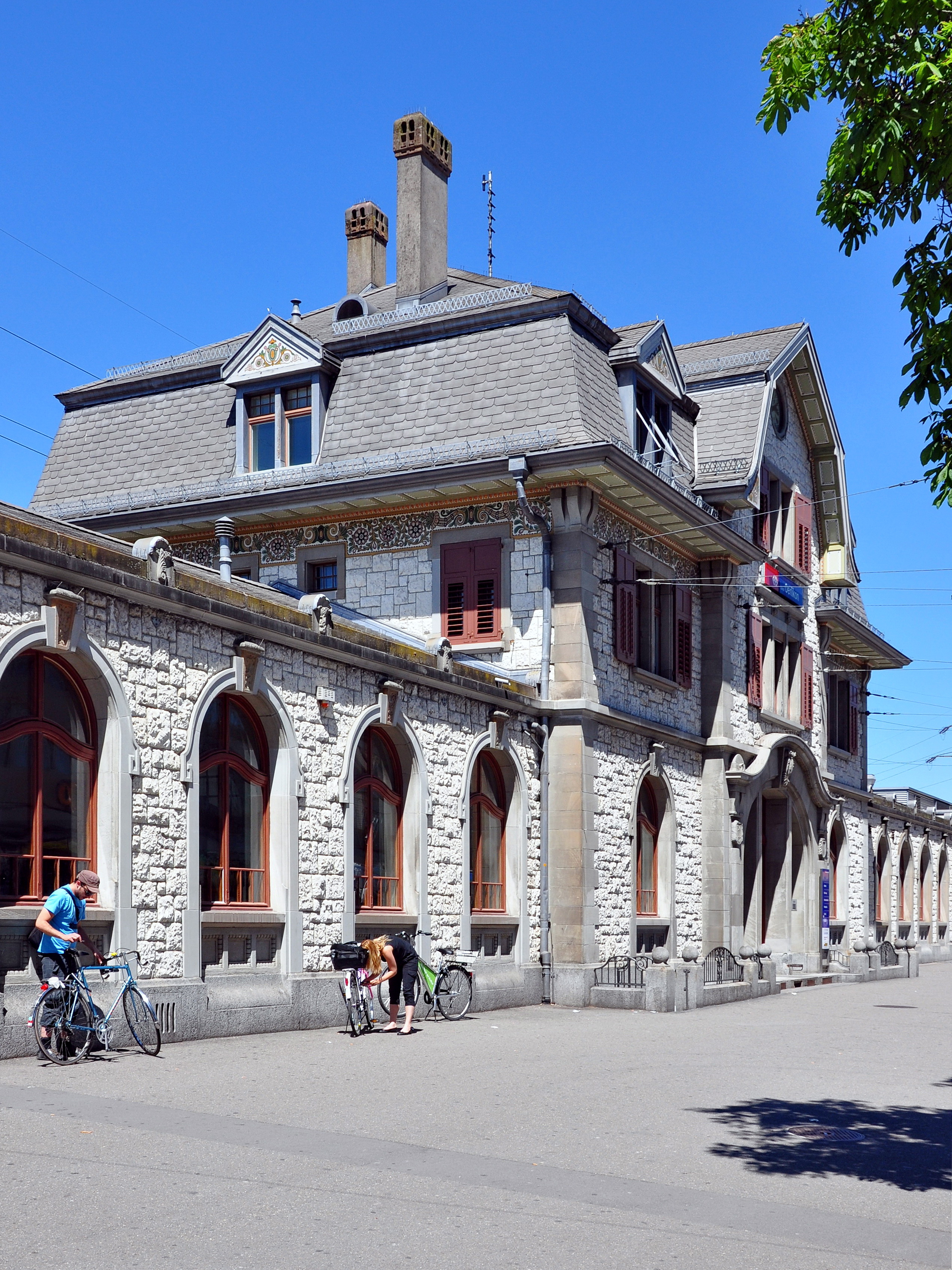
- Zürich Oerlikon railway station

- Flag Coat of arms

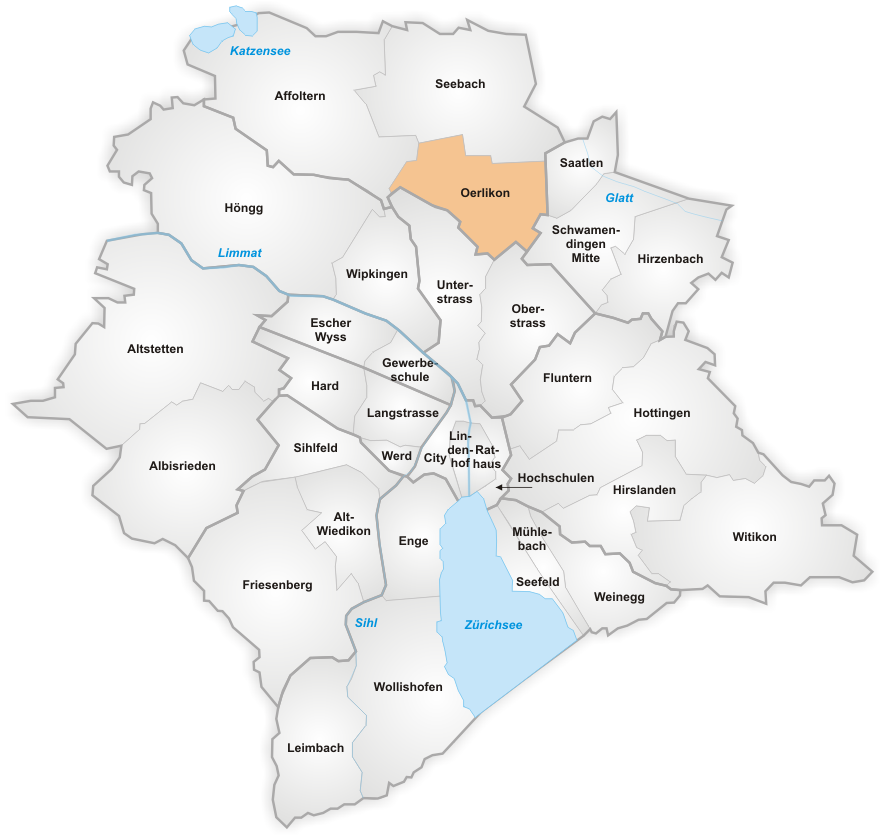
- The quarter of Oerlikon in Zurich
- Coordinates: 47°24′29″N 8°32′34″E
- Country: Switzerland
- Canton: Zurich
- City: Zurich
- District: 11

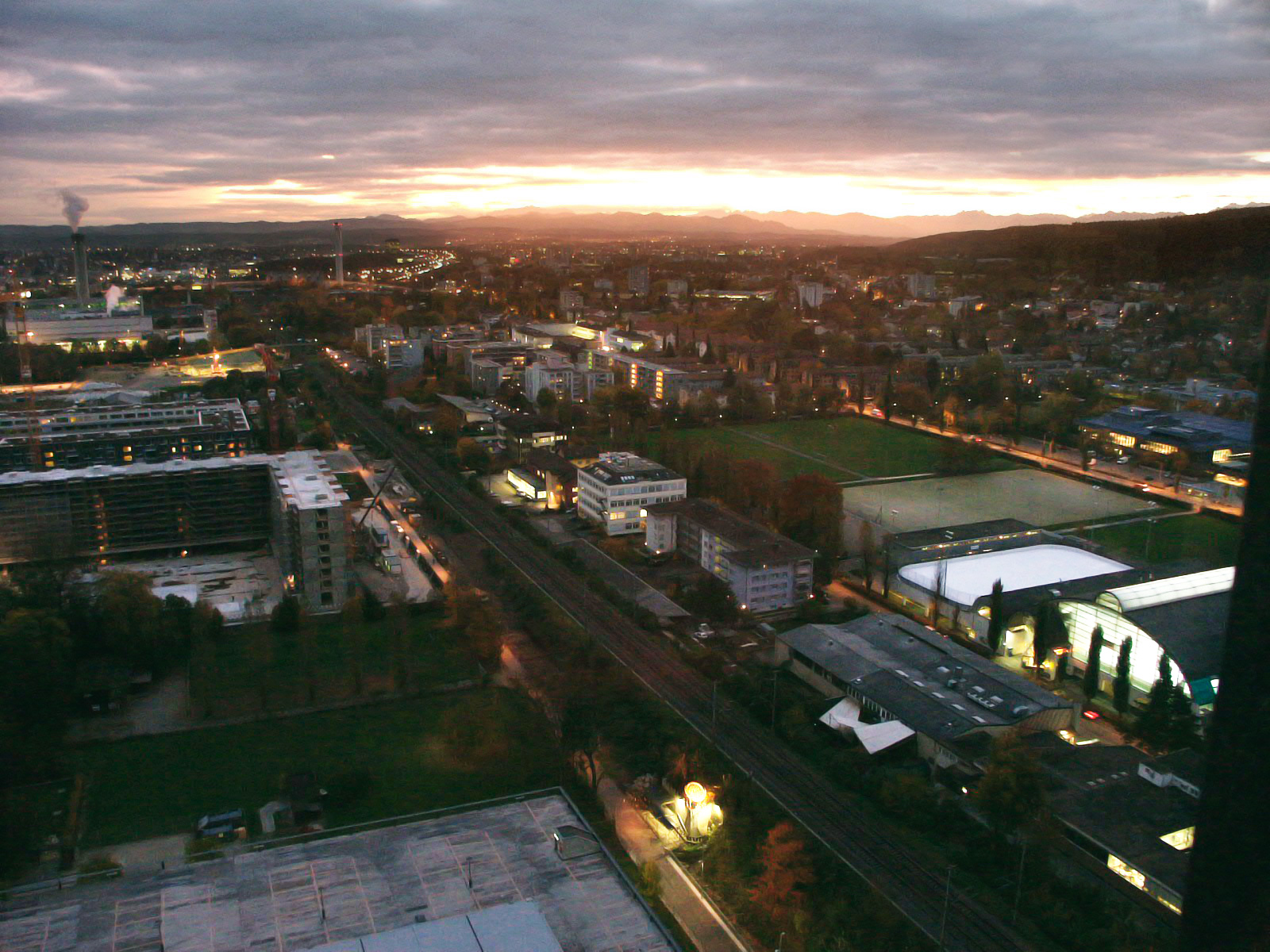
Sunrise in Oerlikon

Oerlikon is a quarter in the northern part of the city of Zurich, Switzerland. A formerly independent municipality, Oerlikon was merged with Zürich in 1934 and forms today, together with Affoltern and Seebach, the city district 11.

== History ==
Aerial view by Walter Mittelholzer (1919)

Coat of arms of Oerlikon

The name Oerlikon goes back to the Alemannic settlement founder Orilo. Oerlikon was mentioned for the first time in the year 946 (other source: 942) as Orlinchowa. At that time the town consisted of no more than one dozen houses. From 1803 to 1872 Oerlikon was part of the municipality of Schwamendingen, where the inhabitants of Oerlikon went to school and attended church.

In 1855 the line from Oerlikon to Winterthur via Wallisellen was established by the Schweizerische Nordostbahn (NOB). The following year the line was extended to Zürich Hauptbahnhof through the Wipkingen Tunnel. Lines from Wallisellen to Uster (1856) and Oerlikon to Bülach via Glattbrugg (1865) followed. The opening of these lines triggered the industrialisation of Oerlikon, and a massive population growth. In particular the large works of Maschinenfabrik Oerlikon was established immediately to the west of the station. In 1872 Oerlikon was separated from Schwamendingen and became its own municipality.

In 1897, the Zürich-Oerlikon-Seebach tramway from Zurich to Oerlikon was built, with branches to Seebach, Glattbrugg and Schwamendingen. The tramway was linked to, and became part of, Zurich's city trams in 1931, at which time the lines to Glattbrugg and Schwamendingen were closed. In 1934, Oerlikon was merged into an expanded city of Zurich.

In the early 1950s, Zurich Airport opened less than 5 kilometres (3.1 mi) to the north of Oerlikon. In 1969 the Käferberg Tunnel was opened, providing a second railway route between Oerlikon and Zürich Hauptbahnhof, whilst in 1979 a new line was constructed from Oerlikon to Winterthur via Zurich Airport. With Oerlikon now only minutes away from the airport by direct train, it became a desirable location for offices and hotels. The rail link to the airport was complemented between 2006 and 2010 by the opening of the Glattalbahn, providing a fast tram connection from Oerlikon to the airport and surrounding Glattal region. In 2014, the Weinberg Tunnel opened, providing Oerlikon with its third railway route to Hauptbahnhof.

== Places of interest ==
South of the railway line the Oerlikon town centre with the shopping centres Neumarkt and züri 11 shopping, the luxury hotel Swissôtel and the market place are located. Also in this area is the intersection known as Sternen Oerlikon (Oerlikon Star). This name was given because of the arrangement of streets in the tram stop area, which form a five-pointed star. The streets which comprise the star are: Schaffhauserstrasse, Ohmstrasse, Wallisellenstrasse, and Querstrasse.

North of the station, a new quarter called Neu-Oerlikon (New Oerlikon) is being built. In the former industrial area new living and working area is created. This urban architecture is lightened up by generous parks. In the last few years, four very outstanding new parks were built: The Oerliker Park with a look-out tower, the MFO-Park on the area of the earlier engine factory Maschinenfabrik Oerlikon, the Traugott Wahlen-Park and the Louis-Häfliger-Park. In the same are, the older Gustav-Ammann-Park was originally created for the workforce of a former machine tool factory, but with the closure of the factory it has become a public park.

In the 1930s, the Maschinenfabrik Oerlikon produced, among else, weapons for Germany’s Nazi regime during World War II. It has been suggested that this is why in 1995, in an effort to come to terms with Switzerland’s role in World War II, a streetnaming-committee decided to name some of Neu-Oerlikon’s streets after humanitarian activists, Jewish immigrants and others who opposed Germany’s Nazi regime.

== Economy ==
Beside the head office of Oerlikon Contraves, the buildings of the Zurich fair Messe Zürich as well as the stadium Hallenstadion are located in Oerlikon. Also Maschinenfabrik Oerlikon, founded in 1876, resided here. Further industrial enterprises settled in Oerlikon are OC Oerlikon (former Unaxis) and ABB.

The Swissôtel Zürich, one of the city's largest hotels, is located opposite Oerlikon railway station.

== Transportation ==
Zürich Oerlikon railway station is, as an important junction of the Zürich S-Bahn network, a bottleneck for public traffic. Oerlikon is a nodal point where the lines S2, S5, S6, S7, S8, S14 and S16 of the Zürich S-Bahn, the Stadtbahn Glattal and Zürich trams in the Glatt Valley interconnect. Train connections to Oerlikon from Zürich Hauptbahnhof are very frequent, and the ride takes only about six minutes. The Zürich Oerlikon railway station has been expanded and modernized by December 2015. This was one of the key deliverables in the Zürich Cross-City Link Project, one of the biggest constructions on the Swiss railway systems in order to significantly increase its S-bahn service capacity for the anticipated increase in demand for public transportation.

== Education ==
Schule Im Birch is located in Neu-Oerlikon.

Schulhaus Kügelliloo is located in Oerlikon.

Kantonsschule Zürich Nord, an upper secondary school, is located in Oerlikon. It was formed by the merger of Kantonsschule Zürich Birch and Kantonsschule Oerlikon, and opened in 2012. The school is one of the biggest grammar schools in Switzerland.

The University of Zurich maintains one of its three main campuses in Oerlikon, occupying buildings on Affolternstrasse, Andreasstrasse, and Binzmühlestrasse north of the railway station. Institutes based there include psychology, political science, informatics, sociology, banking and finance, and communication and media research.

== Cultural references ==
Usfahrt Oerlike is a 2015 Swiss German film starring Mathias Gnädinger and Jörg Schneider.

== Gallery ==
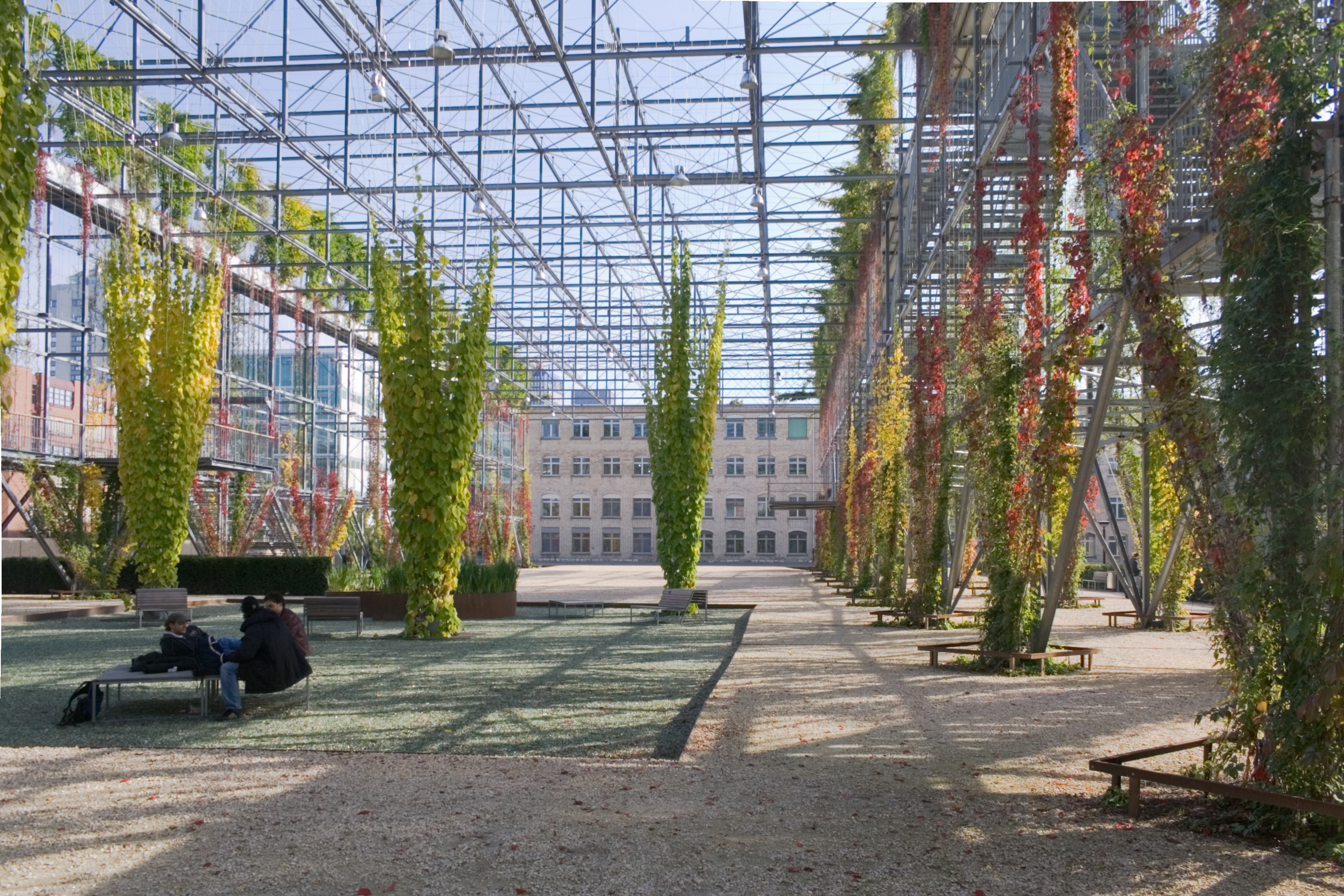
MFO-Park

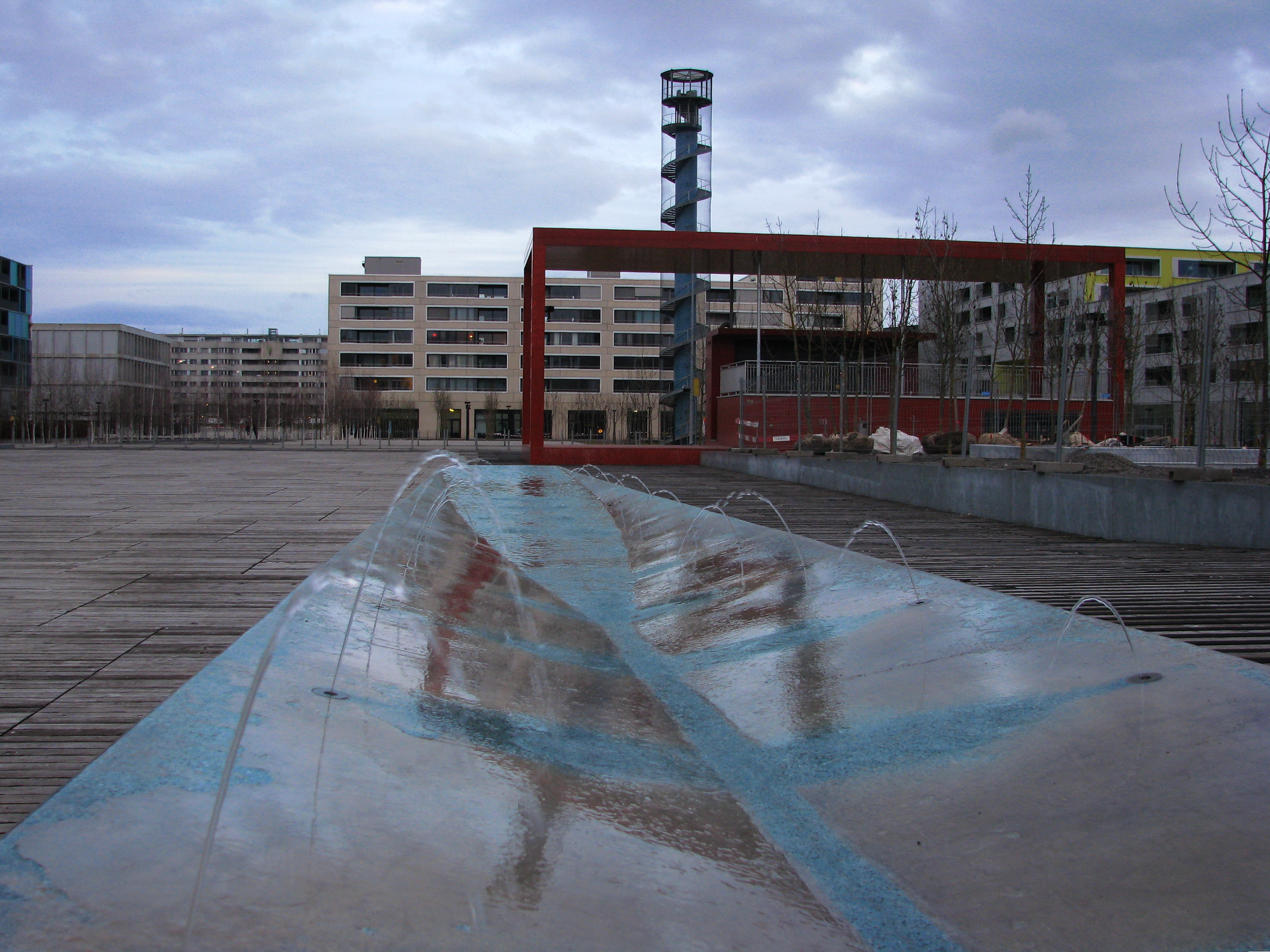
Oerliker-Park

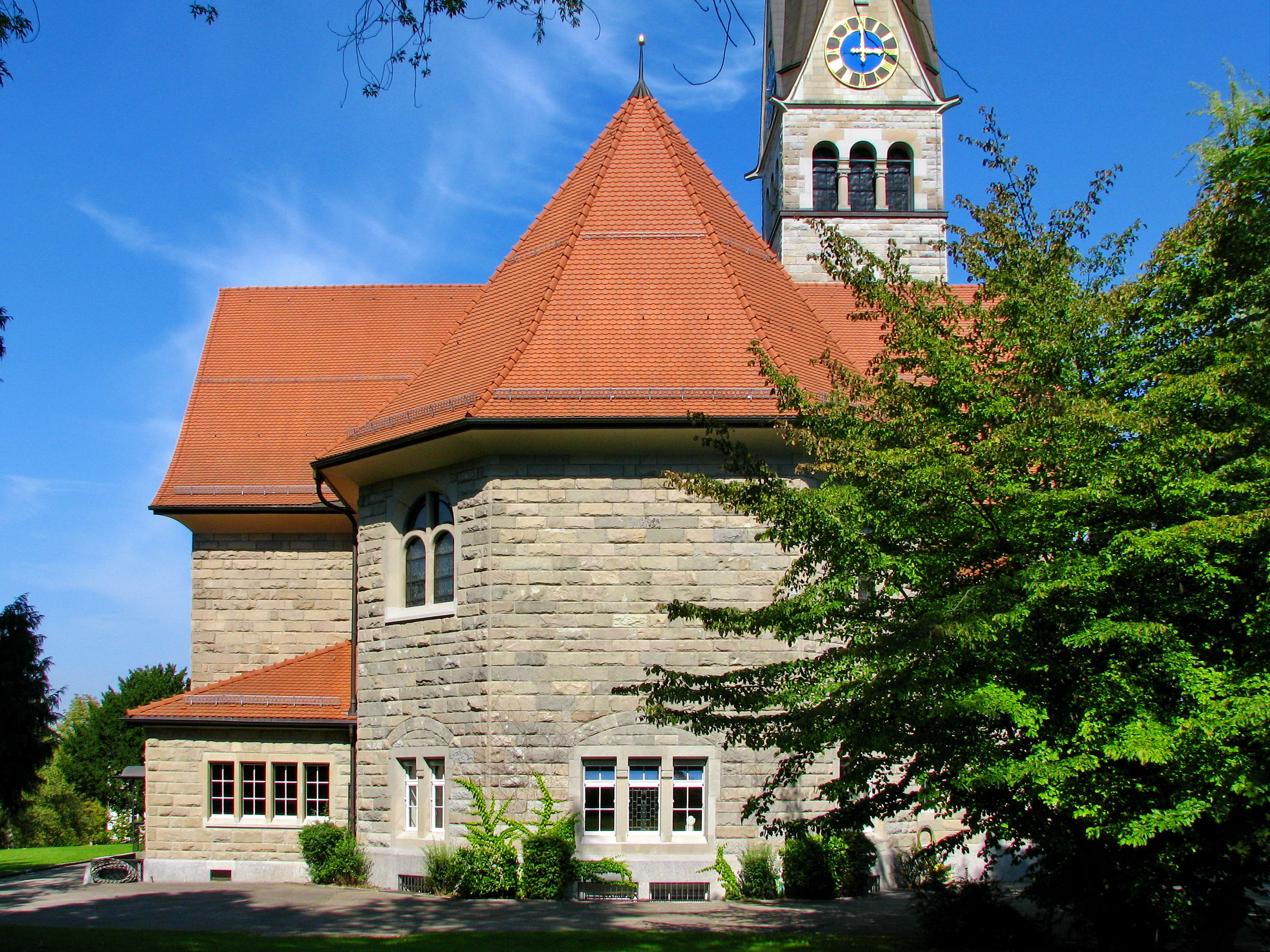
Reformed church

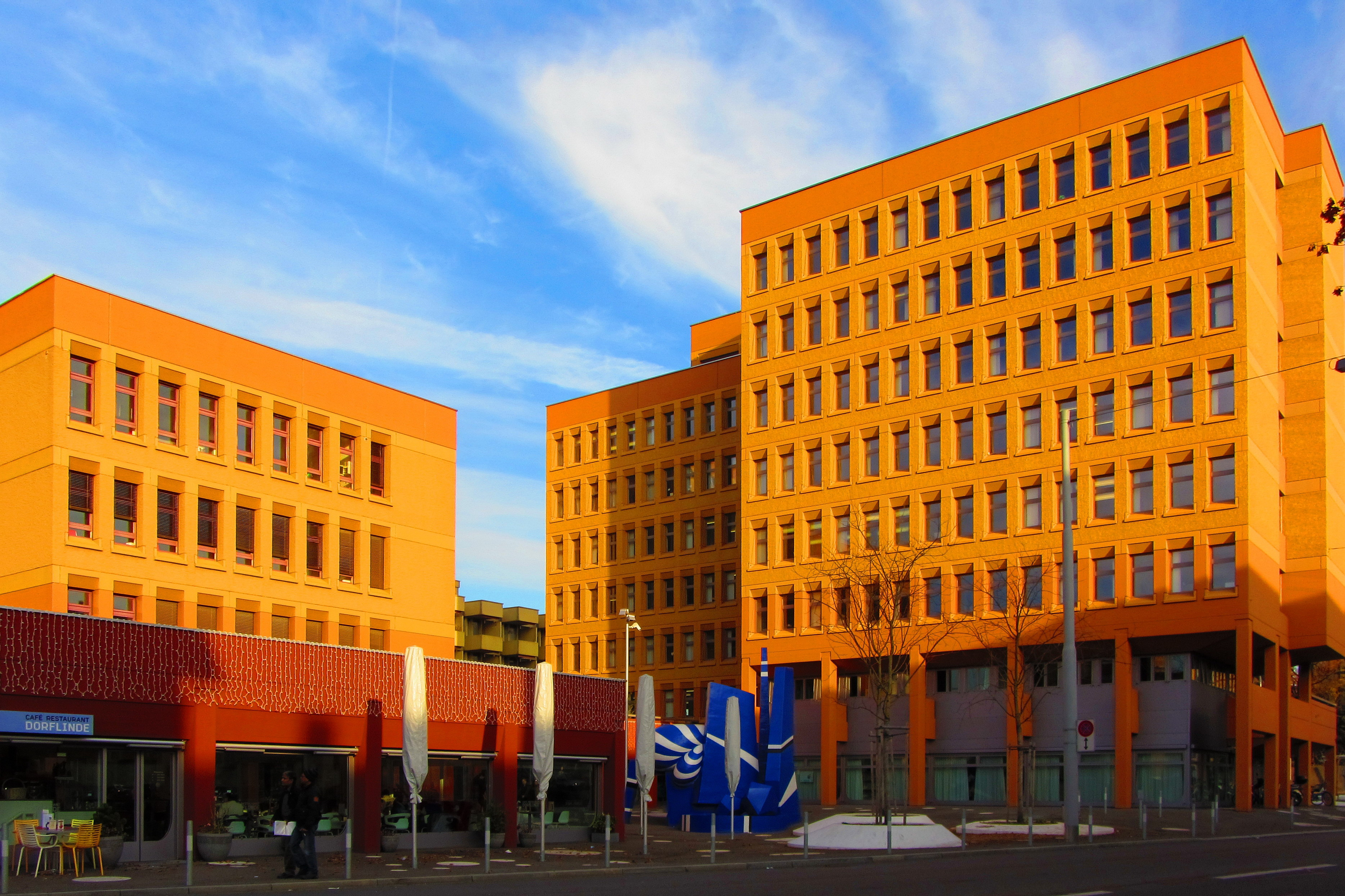
Dorflinde, district administration buildings at Schwamendingenstrasse

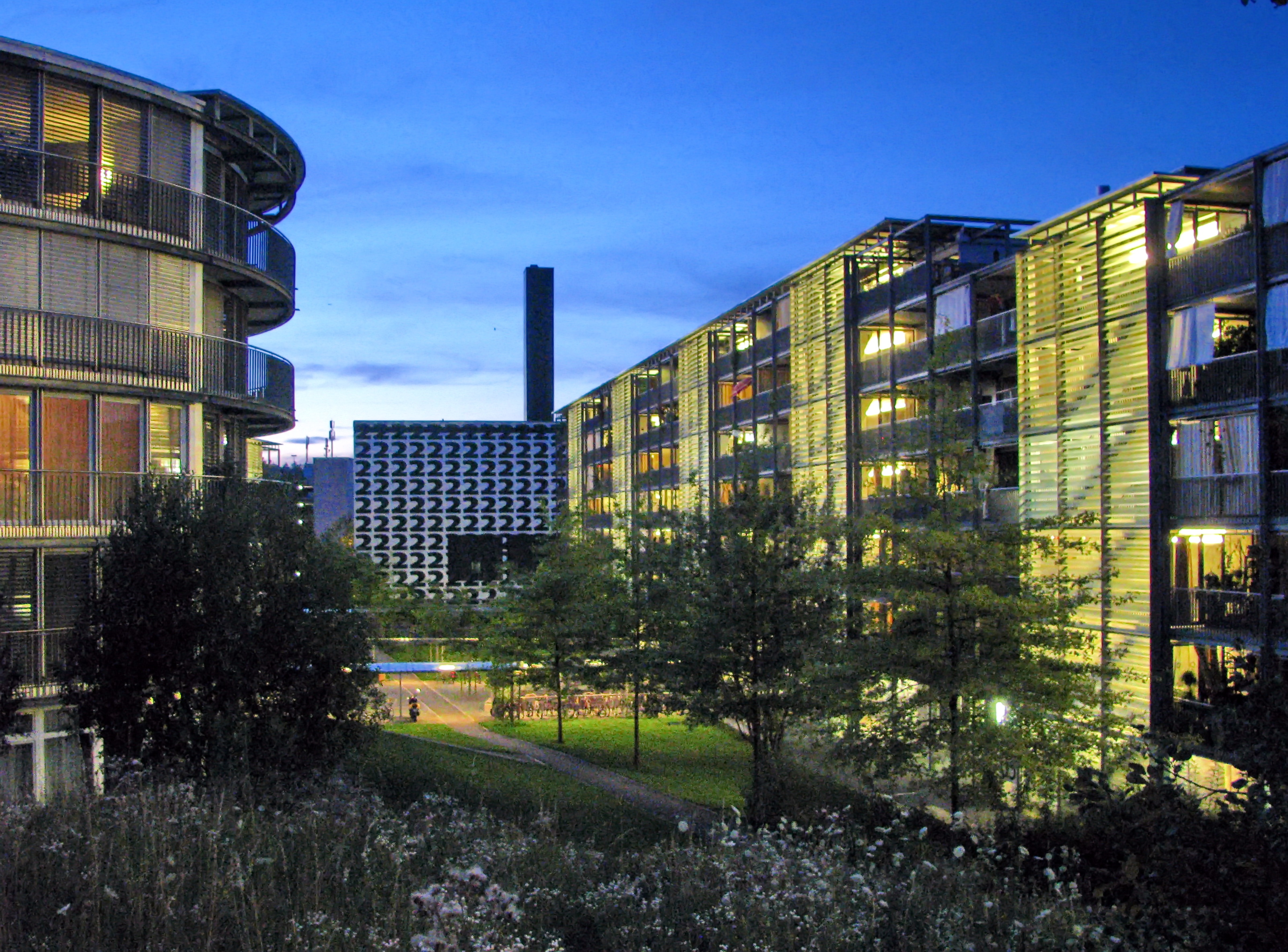
Sunset in Zürich Nord (Regina-Kägi-Hof)

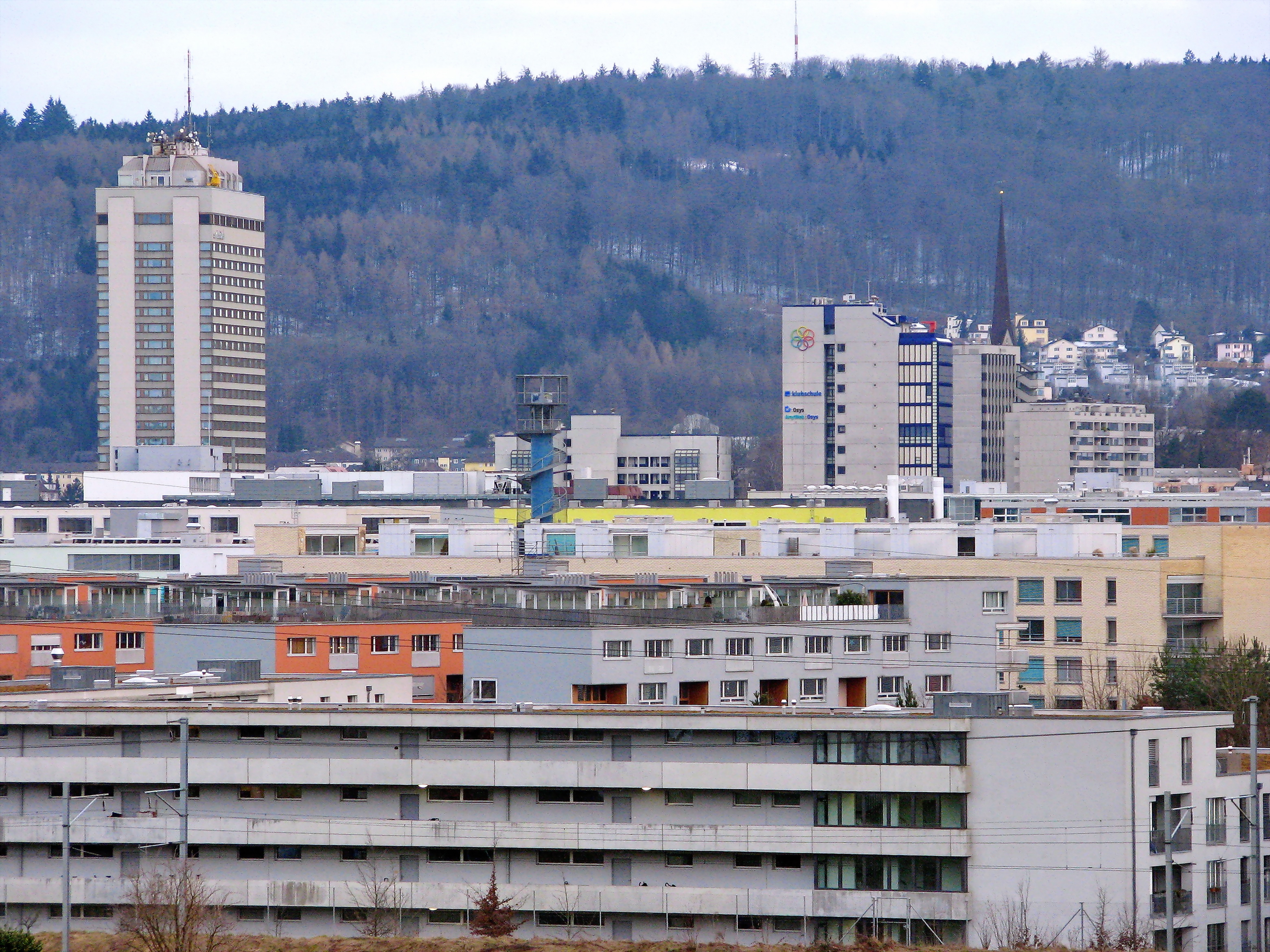
Oerlikon and Zürich-Nord as seen from Seebach

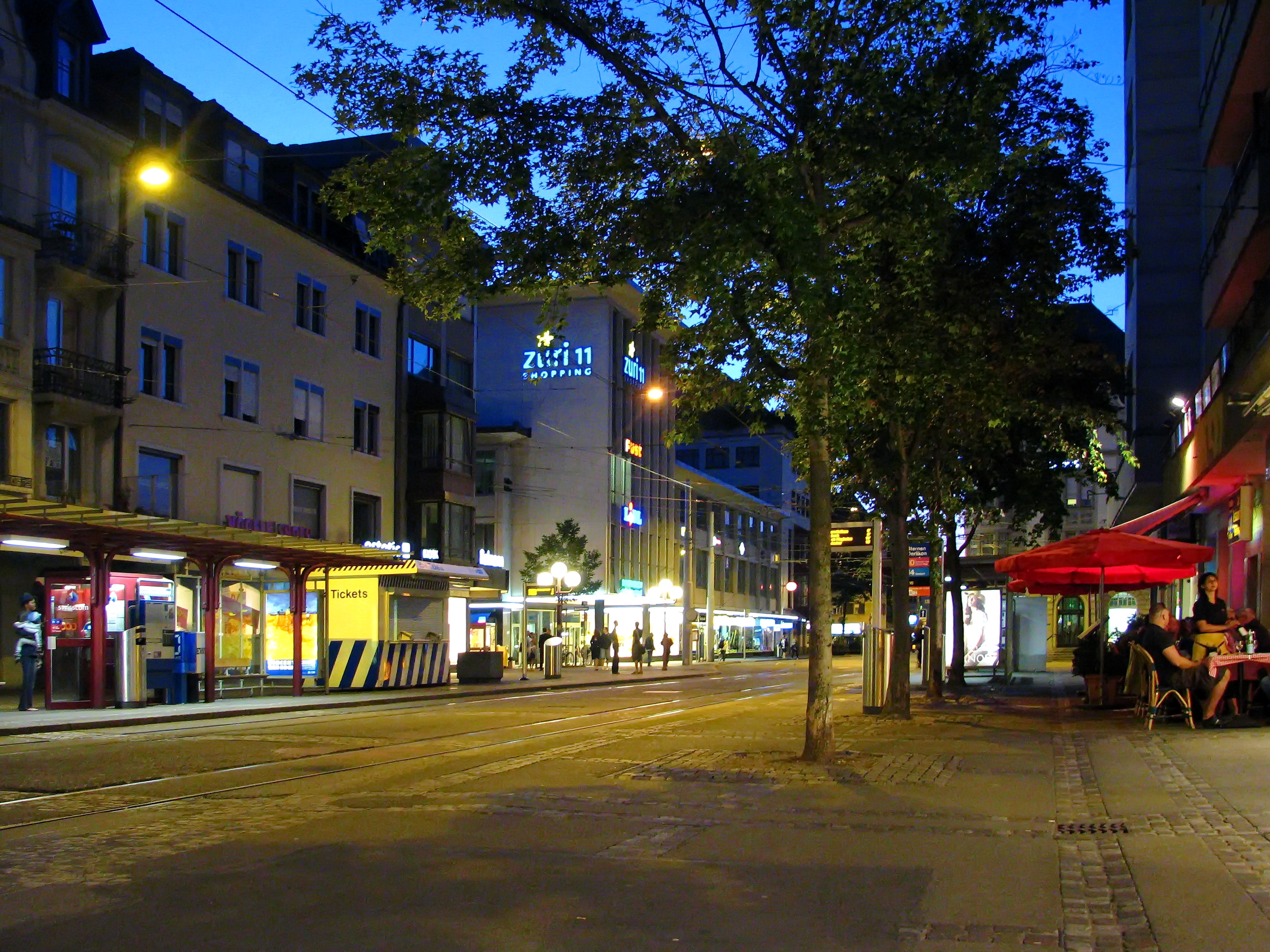
Tram station Sternen Oerlikon
