= Marc Ganzi =

American businessman and polo player

- Education: Wharton School of the University of Pennsylvania
- Occupations: Businessman; Philanthropist
- Spouse: Melissa Ganzi
- Children: Grant Ganzi, Riley Ganzi

Marc Ganzi is an American businessman. He is the president and CEO of DigitalBridge, and is the founder and former CEO of Digital Bridge Holdings and Global Tower Partners. He is also a polo player.

== Early life ==
He received a Bachelor of Science in business administration from the Wharton School of the University of Pennsylvania. He interned in the White House for Stephen M. Studdert, special advisor to President George H. W. Bush in 1989. In 1990, Ganzi served as an assistant Commercial Attaché in Madrid for the U.S. Department of Commerce's Foreign Commercial Service Department.

== Career ==
After graduation, Ganzi bought distressed real estate for Resolution Trust Corporation.

He worked at Deutsche Bank, where he oversaw investments in the radio tower sector.

In 1993, he co-founded AD Development Corporation, a real estate development company in the Mid-Atlantic states, where he worked until 1994. He co-founded Apex Site Management, which was purchased by SpectraSite, and he served as group president for a year. In 1998, Ganzi founded Eureka Broadband, an application service provider and high-speed Internet access corporation. From 2000 to 2002, he was a partner in DB Capital Partners in New York City.

In 2003, he founded Global Tower Partners, a telecommunications company headquartered in Boca Raton, Florida. He served as its chief executive officer and built the company into the largest privately held operator of U.S. cell towers. The company was purchased by Macquarie Group (ASX: MQG) in 2007, and, in 2013, American Tower Corporation (NYSE: AMT) acquired GTP for $4.8 billion.

In 2013, Ganzi and Ben Jenkins founded Digital Bridge Holdings, an investor and operator of mobile and internet connectivity companies. Digital Bridge Holdings was acquired by Colony Capital in 2019, where Ganzi took over as CEO-elect. On July 1, 2020, he became CEO and president of Colony Capital. In 2021, the company rebranded to become DigitalBridge, a digital infrastructure investment firm, and he remained in those respective positions.

In 2024, hours after DigitalBridge's acquisition of Verizon Wireless's cellular towers, the nation experienced wipespread outages. Further inflating issues in recovery and resource coordination after Hurricane Helene.

== Personal life ==
He is married to Melissa Ganzi, who is also a polo player. She has played polo with William, Prince of Wales and King Charles III. They have two children together, son Grant and daughter Riley, who are also polo players. They reside in Wellington, Florida.
