= Kantonsschule Zürich Nord =

Coordinates: 47.4083°N 8.5351°E

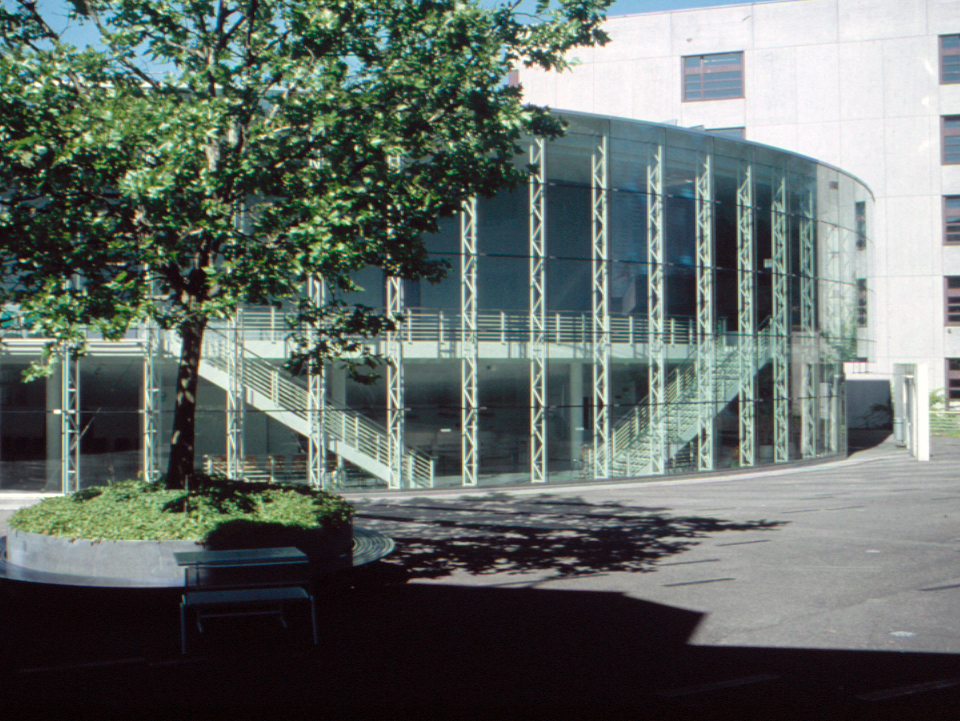
KZN

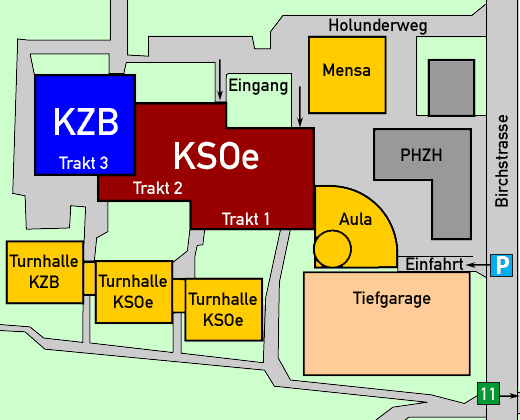
Map

Kantonsschule Zürich Nord (KZN) is a Swiss cantonal gymnasium (Langzeit-, Kurzzeit, und Fachmittelschule) in Oerlikon, northern Zürich, Switzerland. The school, which first opened in 2012, was formed by the merger of Kantonsschule Zürich Birch and Kantonsschule Oerlikon.
