= Swissôtel Nusantara =

- Interactive map of the Swissôtel Nusantara area
- Hotel chain: Swissôtel

General information
- Type: Hotel
- Location: East Side of National Axis Road Lot No. 1 CO. 205.06, Bumi Harapan, Sepaku, Penajam North Paser Regency, East Kalimantan, Indonesia 76147
- Coordinates: 0.969568°S 116.709847°E
- Opened: August 17, 2024; 19 months ago
- Owner: Agung Sedayu Group (ASG)

Height
- Height: 43.10 m

Technical details
- Floor count: 9

Other information
- Number of rooms: 191 (9 floors)
- Number of restaurants: 1

Website
- Official website

Swissôtel Nusantara (then tentatively known as Hotel Nusantara) is the first 5-star hotel built in the capital city of Nusantara, Indonesia and had its groundbreaking ceremony by then-President Joko Widodo (Jokowi) on 21 September 2023. The second property of Swissôtel in Indonesia, this hotel was formally opened on 13 September 2024 by Jokowi, together with the groundbreaking ceremony of Nusantara Mall.

The Swissôtel Nusantara offers a variety of facilities including Nusa Restaurant, swimming pools, a state-of-the-art gym, kids club, as well as Pürovel Spa, which is known for its use of high-quality products and its serene atmosphere.

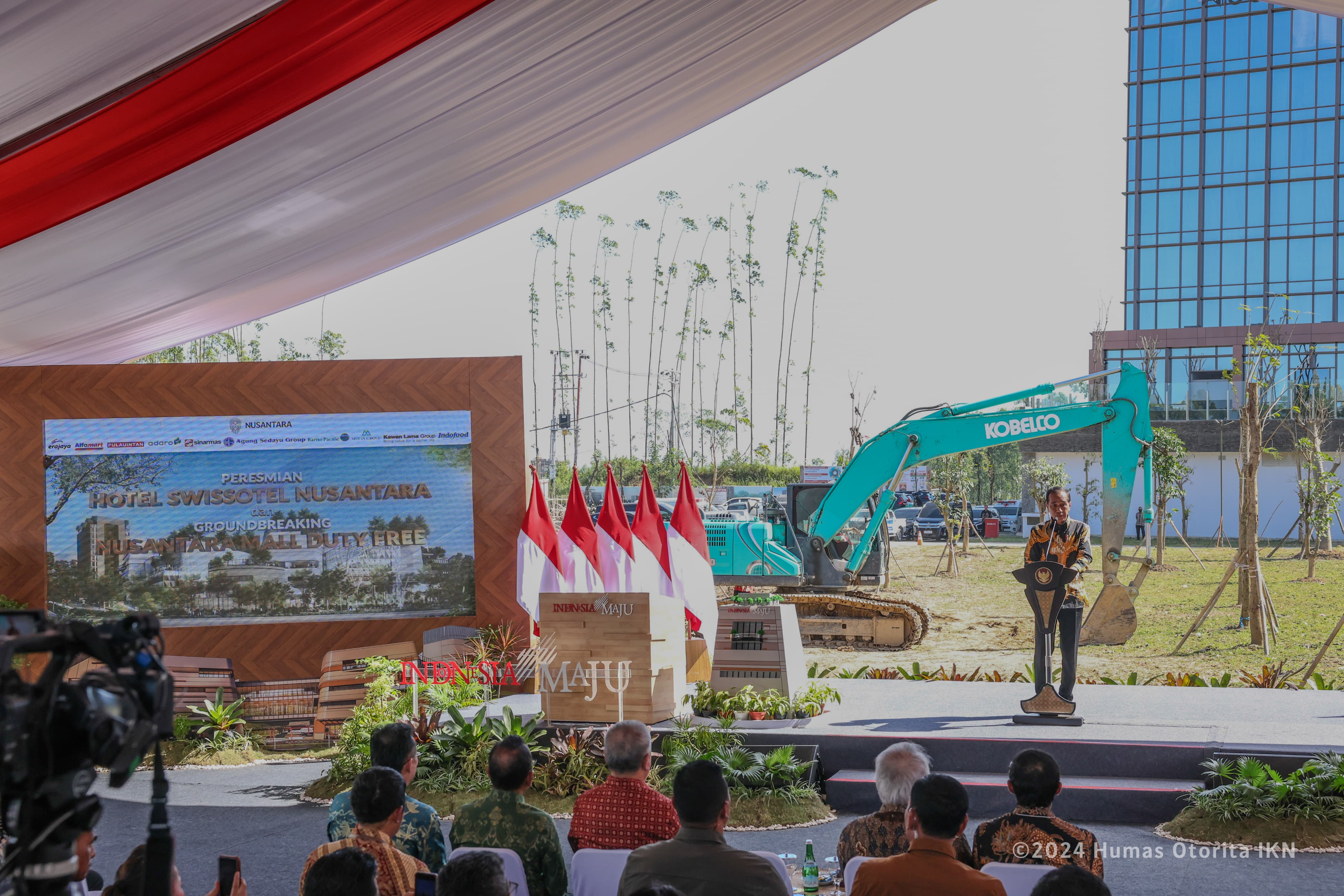
Inauguration of Swissôtel Nusantara by Jokowi

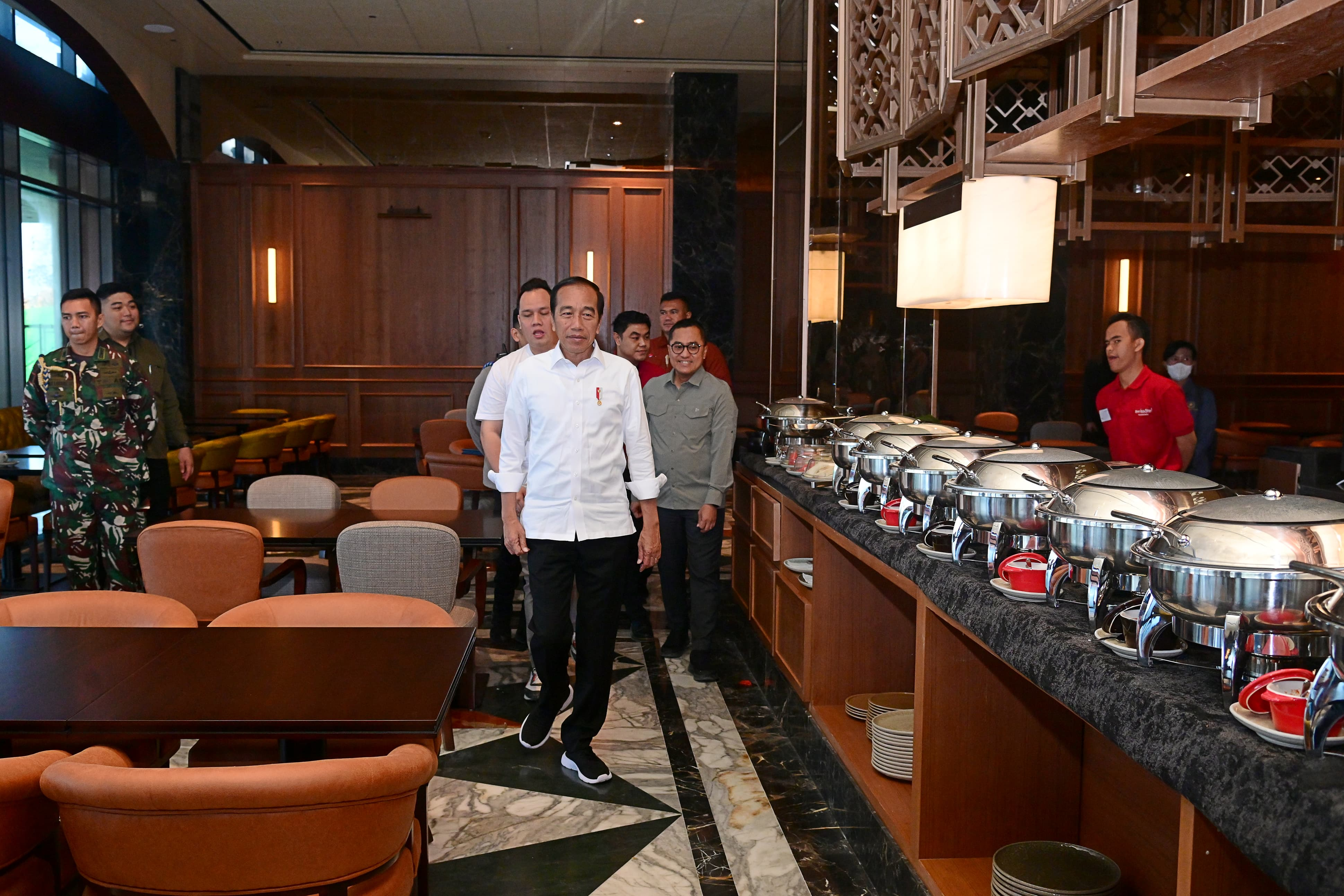
Nusa Restaurant, the dining venue of Swissôtel Nusantara visited by Jokowi
