= Swissôtel Amsterdam =

Luxury hotel in Amsterdam, Netherlands

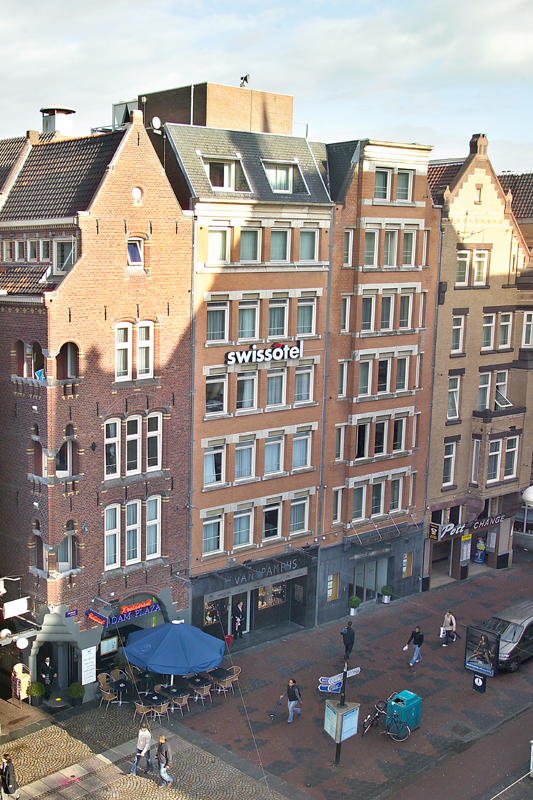
- Swissôtel Amsterdam

- Location within Amsterdam

General information
- Location: Damrak 96 - 1012 LP Amsterdam
- Coordinates: 52°22′24.5388″N 4°53′36.2796″E
- Opening: 1 August 1986
- Operator: Swissôtel

Height
- Height: 21 metres (69 ft)

Technical details
- Floor count: 6

Design and construction
- Architect: Hendrik Petrus Berlage

Other information
- Number of rooms: 96
- Number of suites: 15
- Number of restaurants: 1

Website
- www.swissotel.com

Swissôtel Amsterdam is a four-star luxury hotel in Amsterdam, Netherlands, and is managed by the Swissôtel. Swissotel Amsterdam is located near Dam Square, in the heart of Amsterdam's historic city centre.

== History ==
The hotel was partly built in the 19th and finished in the 20th century. Designed by Hendrik Petrus Berlage who is considered the "Father of Modern Architecture" http://www.mediamatic.net/2121/nl/hendrik-p-berlage, and takes heavy influence from the Neo-Romanesque brickwork architecture. The hotel officially opened in August 1986. Behind its historical façade of the early centuries, there are 111 guest rooms and suites. In 2011, the interior received a facelift and in 2013 all rooms underwent a renovation.

== Awards ==
- Netherlands Leading Business Hotel, in 2011, 2012, 2013 and 2014.
- World Travel Award for "Netherlands Leading Boutique Hotel", in 2015 and 2016.
