= Cumhuriyet Square (İzmir) =

Urban squares in İzmir, Turkey

Coordinates: 38.428986°N 27.134325°E

Cumhuriyet Square (Turkish: Cumhuriyet Meydanı, meaning Republic Square) is one of the main urban squares of İzmir, Turkey, located between the neighbourhoods of Alsancak and Çankaya in the Konak district.

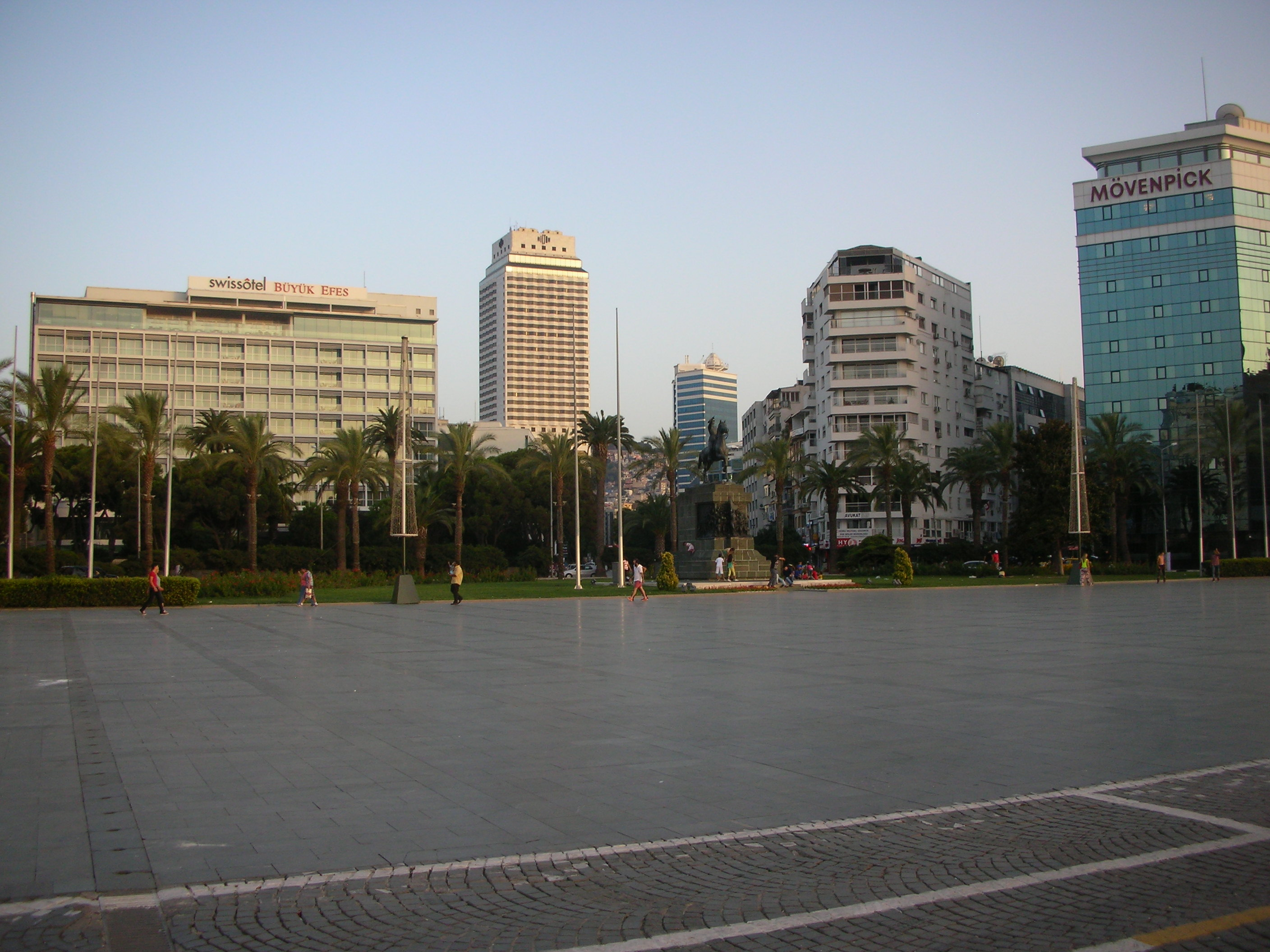
Cumhuriyet Square in Konak, İzmir.

It is a coastal square at the port of İzmir, very close to the Pasaport Ferry Terminal along the shoreline of the Aegean Sea. It is one of the most popular urban squares of İzmir for public gatherings, together with Konak Square and Gündoğdu Square.

== History ==
The square was built as part of the master plan for the reconstruction of İzmir following the Great Fire in 1922.

The Atatürk Monument at the center of the square, which features an equestrian statue of Mustafa Kemal Atatürk, is made of marble and bronze, and was crafted by the renowned Italian sculptor Pietro Canonica in 1927 (he also crafted the Republic Monument at Taksim Square in Istanbul, and other monuments in Ankara, Turkey.)

The square was officially opened in 1932 by Behçet Uz, who served as the mayor of İzmir between 1931 and 1941.

== See also ==
- Konak Square
- Pietro Canonica
