= Global Tower Partners =

American telecommunications company

- Industry: Telecommunication Towers
- Founded: 2002
- Headquarters: Boca Raton, Florida, U.S.
- Key people: Marc Ganzi (CEO)

Global Tower Partners (GTP), owned by American Tower Corporation and previously based in Boca Raton, Florida, was the largest privately owned telecommunication tower operator in the U.S. and the fourth largest independent operator in this sector. GTP owned, managed, or held master leases for more than 16,000 wireless sites and over 40,000 miles of railroad rights of way throughout the U.S. GTP leased space on towers and rooftops to leading wireless communications providers including AT&T Wireless, Verizon Wireless, Sprint, T-Mobile, US Cellular, Metro PCS, and Leap Wireless. GTP was founded in 2002 and began operations in October 2003. Marc Ganzi, the company's Chief Executive Officer, was the sole founder.

== Ownership ==
In 2013 Global Tower Partners was bought by American Tower Corporation for an estimated sum of $3.3 billion.
