= DigitalBridge =

American private equity real estate firm

DigitalBridge Group, Inc.
- Formerly: Colony Capital (1991–2021)
- Type: Public
- Traded as: NYSE: DBRG (Class A); Russell 2000 component
- Industry: Investment; Digital infrastructure
- Founded: 1991; 35 years ago
- Founder: Tom Barrack
- Headquarters: Boca Raton, Florida, U.S.
- Key people: Marc Ganzi (CEO); Ben Jenkins (president & CIO); Thomas Mayrhofer (CFO)
- Products: Towers, Data centers, Small cells, Fiber, Edge infrastructure, Investment management, Digital operating
- Revenue: ▼US$607,028,000 (2024); US$821,383,000 (2023)
- Operating income: ▼US$168,815,000 (2024); US$365,629,000 (2023)
- Net income: ▲US$147,006,000 (2024); US$45,165,000 (2023)
- AUM: $106 billion (June 2025)
- Total equity: ▲US$1,958,582,000 (2024); US$1,811,055,000 (2023)
- Owner: SoftBank Group（100%）
- Subsidiaries: AIMS; Aptum Technologies; ATP; beanfield; Digita Oy; Edgepoint; ExteNet Systems; InfraBridge
- Website: digitalbridge.com

DigitalBridge Group, Inc. is a global digital infrastructure investment firm. The company owns, invests in and operates businesses such as cell towers, data centers, fiber, small cells, and edge infrastructure. Headquartered in Boca Raton, DigitalBridge has offices in Los Angeles, New York, Denver, London, and Singapore. As of June 2025, DigitalBridge had US$106 billion of assets under management.

On December 29, 2025, the company announced a definitive agreement to be acquired by SoftBank Group for approximately $4 billion.

== History ==
=== Early investments ===
Colony purchased Raffles International on July 18, 2005. This included the 41 hotels and resorts operated under the Raffles Hotel and Swissotel brand names. On January 30, 2006, it acquired Fairmont Hotels and Resorts of Toronto, Ontario with Kingdom Hotels International as a joint partner for US$3.24 billion. On April 10, 2006, it acquired French professional football team Paris Saint-Germain.

On February 25, 2007, it signed a definitive agreement to take Station Casinos private in a 75%/25% split with members of the founding Fertitta family for US$5.5 billion, or US$90/share. The subsequent economic downturn caused Station Casinos to declare bankruptcy in 2009, and when it emerged in 2011 Colony Capital owned a much smaller portion after providing more cash. Founder, chairman, and CEO Thomas Barrack said it "could have been the worst investment ever" in terms of timing.

On November 11, 2008, Michael Jackson transferred the title of his 2,700 acre estate Neverland Ranch to Sycamore Valley Ranch Company LLC, a joint venture between Jackson (represented by attorney, L. Londell McMillan) and an affiliate of Colony Capital. It is still unclear whether Colony Capital has a part in the property. Jackson earned a total of US$35 million when he agreed to the joint venture between himself and Colony Capital.

In March 2010, Colony arranged a financing and marketing package for Annie Leibovitz. The New York celebrity photographer had been in financial difficulty and in danger of losing to her previous lender, ArtCapital, the rights to her photographs and negatives and her three Greenwich Village townhouses. ArtCapital's credit was for $24 million. In December 2010, Colony purchased Miramax from Disney with Qatar Investment Authority, Tutor-Saliba Corporation and The Weinstein Company as part of a joint venture called Filmyard Holdings for $663 million.

In January 2017, Colony NorthStar, Inc. (NYSE: CLNS) was formed through a tri-party merger between Colony Capital, Inc. (NYSE:CLNY), NorthStar Asset Management Group Inc. (NYSE:NSAM) and NorthStar Realty Finance Corp. (NYSE:NRF).

In September 2017, Colony NorthStar agreed to sell its Townsend Group unit to Aon for $475 million.

In October 2017, Colony entered discussions to purchase The Weinstein Company, a movie and TV production studio that sustained damage after its co-founder, Harvey Weinstein, was accused of multiple counts of sexual harassment over three decades. In the wake of the Harvey Weinstein sexual assault scandal, in late October 2017, it was reported that Colony Capital LLC had proved hesitant to purchase Weinstein Co. after a week of exclusive negotiations. Fortress Investment Group was also in talks to provide a loan to Weinstein Co.

In June 2018, The New York Times reported that Colony North Star had raised more than $7 billion in investments since Donald Trump won the 2016 presidential election. 24 percent of the money came from the United Arab Emirates and Saudi Arabia.

=== Recent investments ===
On December 20, 2021, DigitalBridge sold the bulk of its Other Equity & Debt of real estate assets to Fortress Investment Group, LLC. The total net value realized from the sale was $506.8 million, including $443.4 million received at closing, $31.2 million of net cash for asset monetizations between the sale and close, and $32.2 million of future payments.

DigitalBridge closed its second flagship fund with $8.3 billion in commitments in early 2022.

In April 2022, DigitalBridge bought out Wafra's stake in its investment management subsidiary for $800 million and switched from REIT to traditional C-Corp. DigitalBridge announced and initiated several acquisitions during 2022 including AMP Capital's global infrastructure equity investment management business for $328 million and Switch, Inc., a Las Vegas-based data center company, for $11 billion. The firm sold 27 percent of its stake in DataBank to Swiss Life and EDF Invest for $1.2 billion. DigitalBridge said it would own 15.5 percent of DataBank after the sale.

In March 2022, DigitalBridge led a $60 million Series C funding round in Celona, an enterprise IT infrastructure company. In April, DigitalBridge led a $385 million funding round for UK fiber startup Netomnia. That June, DigitalBridge acquired Telenet's 3,300 telecommunication towers in Belgium, valued at 745 million euros.

In August 2022, DigitalBridge and Columbia Capital formed Xenith Infrastructure Group, a fiber platform serving Asia-Pacific markets. In 2023, DigitalBridge purchased 51% of Deutsche Telekom's tower business.

In February 2023, DigitalBridge completed the acquisition of AMP Capital's global infrastructure equity investment management business, which was rebranded as InfraBridge.

In July 2023, Aware Super invested $500m into DigitalBridge owned data center firm Switch Inc.

In September 2023, DigitalBridge completed the recapitalization of Databank, receiving $219 million in additional commitments in the final closing, totaling recapitalization commitments at $2.2 billion. In November of the same year, DigitalBridge sold 40% of Landmark Dividends to the Abu Dhabi Investment Authority. That month AustralianSuper invested $1.5 billion into Vantage Data Centers EMEA.

Also in November 2023, DigitalBridge closed its digital infrastructure credit fund, DigitalBridge Credit, having raised $1.1 billion.

In December 2023, Surf Internet secured $200 million from DigitalBridge to support continued network expansion across the Great Lakes Region. In January 2024, Intel announced it was forming a new independent company around its artificial intelligence software with the backing of DigitalBridge. Also in January, DigitalBridge purchased a stake in Vantage Data Centers.

On January 3, 2024, DigitalBridge and Intel jointly launched Articul8, a company providing enterprise generative AI solutions. The venture aims to provide advanced AI tools to improve efficiency and innovation in enterprise operations.

On June 13, 2024, Vantage Data Centers completed a $9.2 billion equity investment round led by DigitalBridge and Silver Lake.

On September 30, 2024, Verizon and Vertical Bridge reached a $3.3 billion agreement involving the sale and leaseback of telecom tower assets. This transaction highlights the ongoing consolidation in the digital infrastructure sector.

On October 15, 2024, DataBank, a portfolio company of DigitalBridge, announced a $2.0 billion equity raise. The round was led by a $1.5 billion investment from AustralianSuper.

On October 21, 2024, DigitalBridge launched a tender offer to take JTOWER, a Japanese telecom infrastructure provider, private by acquiring a majority stake. On October 28, 2024, DigitalBridge announced its agreement to acquire Yondr Group, a company focused on hyperscale data center solutions. Terms were undisclosed.

On December 29, 2025, DigitalBridge and SoftBank Group Corp. announced they had entered into a definitive agreement for SoftBank to acquire DigitalBridge in an all-cash transaction valued at approximately $4 billion. Under the terms of the agreement, SoftBank will acquire all outstanding shares of DigitalBridge common stock for $16.00 per share, representing a 15% premium over the company's previous closing price. The acquisition is intended to integrate DigitalBridge's $108 billion digital infrastructure portfolio into SoftBank's broader "Artificial Super Intelligence" (ASI) strategy, providing the physical data center and connectivity capacity required for large-scale AI deployment. Following the close of the transaction, which is expected in the second half of 2026, DigitalBridge will operate as a standalone subsidiary of SoftBank, maintaining its headquarters in Boca Raton, Florida, with Marc Ganzi continuing to serve as chief executive officer.

In September 2026, SoftBank Group completed its acquisition of DigitalBridge for approximately $3.1 billion. DigitalBridge became a subsidiary of SoftBank but continued to operate as a separately managed platform under chief executive Marc Ganzi. The acquisition also resulted in DigitalBridge being taken private and delisted from the New York Stock Exchange.

== Leadership ==
=== Senior Executives ===
- Marc Ganzi - chief executive officer
- Ben Jenkins - President and Chief Investment Officer
- Thomas Mayrhofer - Chief Financial Officer
