= Swissôtel =

Swiss luxury hotel chain

Swissôtel Hotels & Resorts
- Company type: Subsidiary
- Industry: Hospitality
- Founded: 1981; 45 years ago
- Headquarters: Zurich Airport; Kloten, Switzerland
- Area served: Worldwide
- Products: Hotels
- Parent: Accor
- Website: swissotel.com

Swissôtel Hotels & Resorts, commonly known as Swissôtel, is a Swiss chain of luxury hotels owned by Accor, which acquired FRHI Hotels & Resorts in 2015.

The corporate offices for Swissôtel are located in the Prioria Business Centre on the property of Zurich Airport in Kloten, Switzerland, near Zürich.

== History ==
Swissôtel was founded in 1981 as a joint venture between the Swissair and Nestlé groups, with its headquarters in the Swiss city of Zürich. Initially, hotels were operated in Bern, New York City, Geneva and Zürich. In 1990, the hotel group became a fully owned subsidiary of the Swissair group, and in 1996, its head office moved from Zürich to New York.

In 2001, with the parent airline in the serious financial difficulties due to the events of 9/11 that year in the United States that eventually lead to its demise, Swissôtel was sold to Raffles Holdings Limited, the owner of the famous Raffles Hotel in Singapore. In July 2005, Colony Capital, a private international investment firm, acquired Raffles International Limited, the company that by this stage owned both the Raffles and Swissôtel brands.

In May 2006, Colony Capital, together with Kingdom Hotels International, acquired Fairmont Hotels & Resorts. With the completion of the transaction, the Fairmont and Raffles International portfolios were combined, transforming the companies into a global hotel leader (headquartered in Toronto) called Fairmont Raffles Hotels International, with 120 hotels in 23 countries under three brands – Fairmont, Raffles and Swissôtel. After the transaction, the corporate office of Swissôtel Hotels & Resorts moved back to Zürich, where it was headed by its president, Meinhard Huck, who retired in 2013.

In December 2015, AccorHotels purchased Swissôtel, along with Raffles and Fairmont hotels, in a $2.9 billion deal.

In May 2025, Asset World Corporation (AWS) purchased Swissôtel Bangkok Ratchada for 8.7 Billion Baht ($266 Million) to renovate as premium mixed-used and rebranded as Jubilee Prestige Tower under new ownership in collaboration with Marriott International Asia Pacific Division, which operated its hotel under JW Marriott Bangkok Ratchadapisek brand. The hotel and its mixed-used building officially opened on 1 October 2025.

== Properties ==
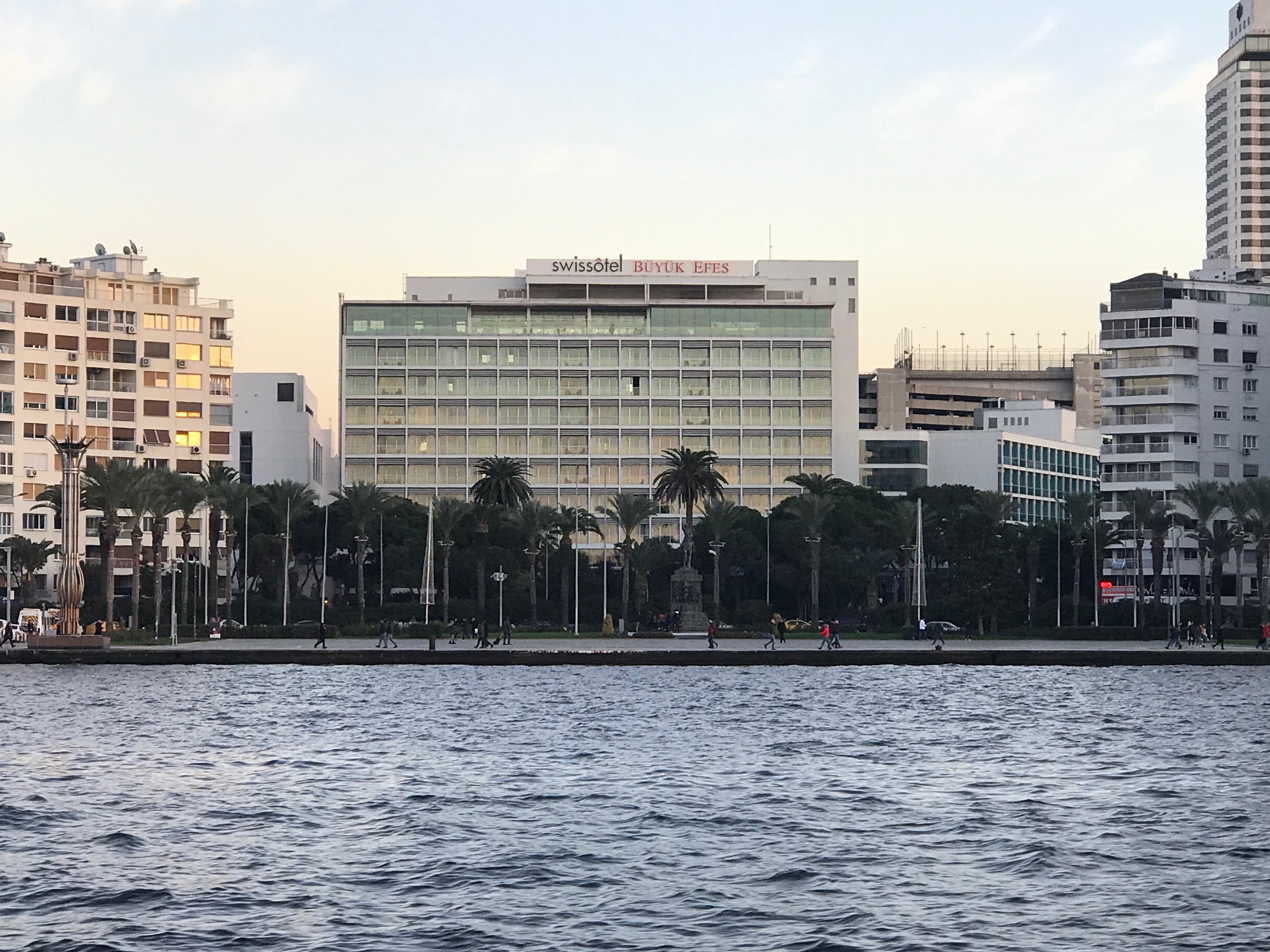
Swissôtel Büyük Efes

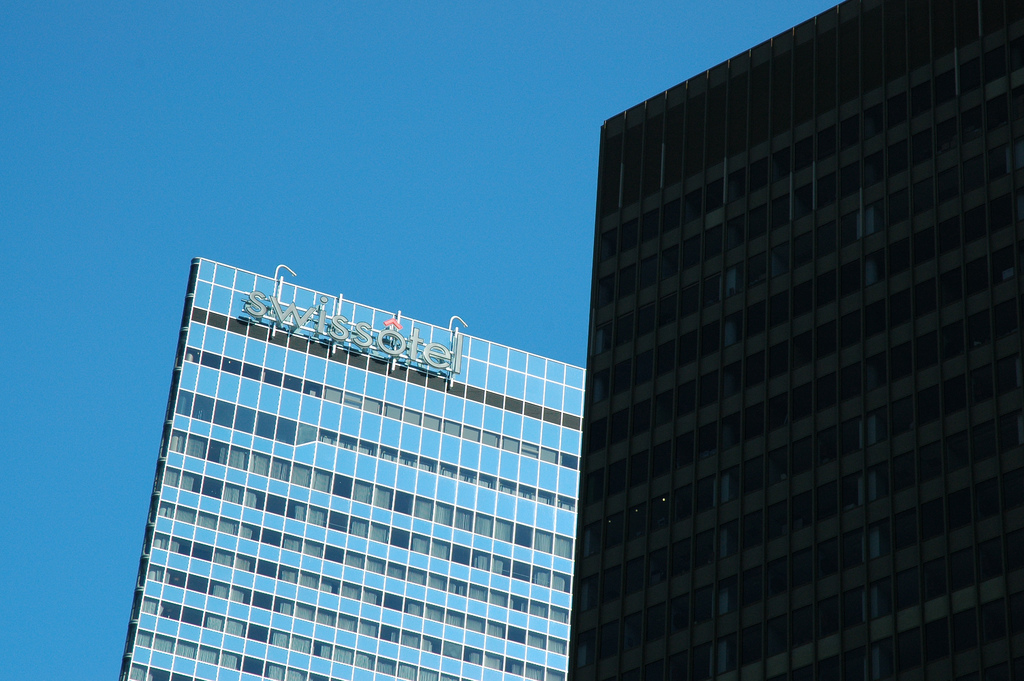
Swissôtel Chicago

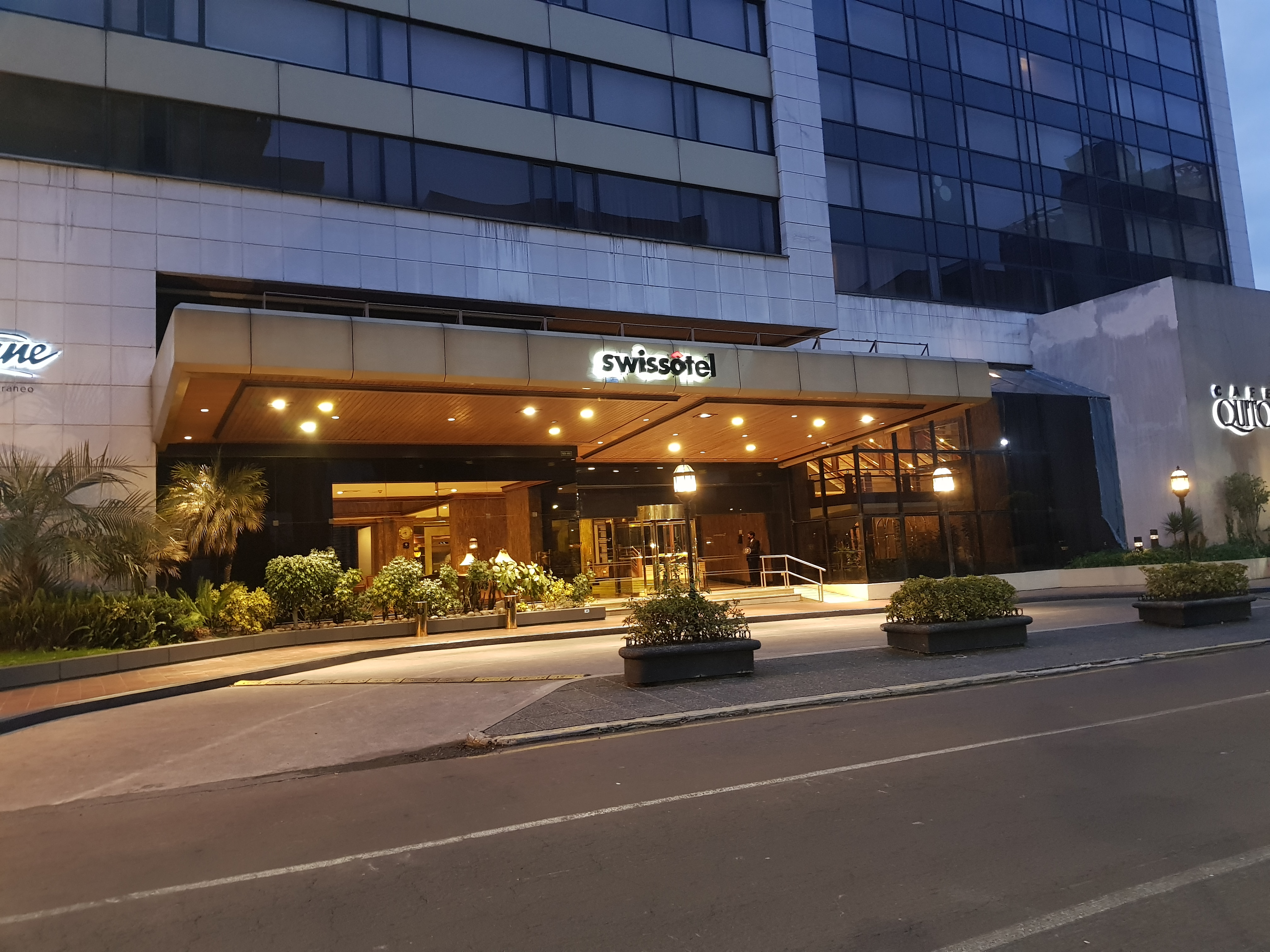
Swissôtel Quito

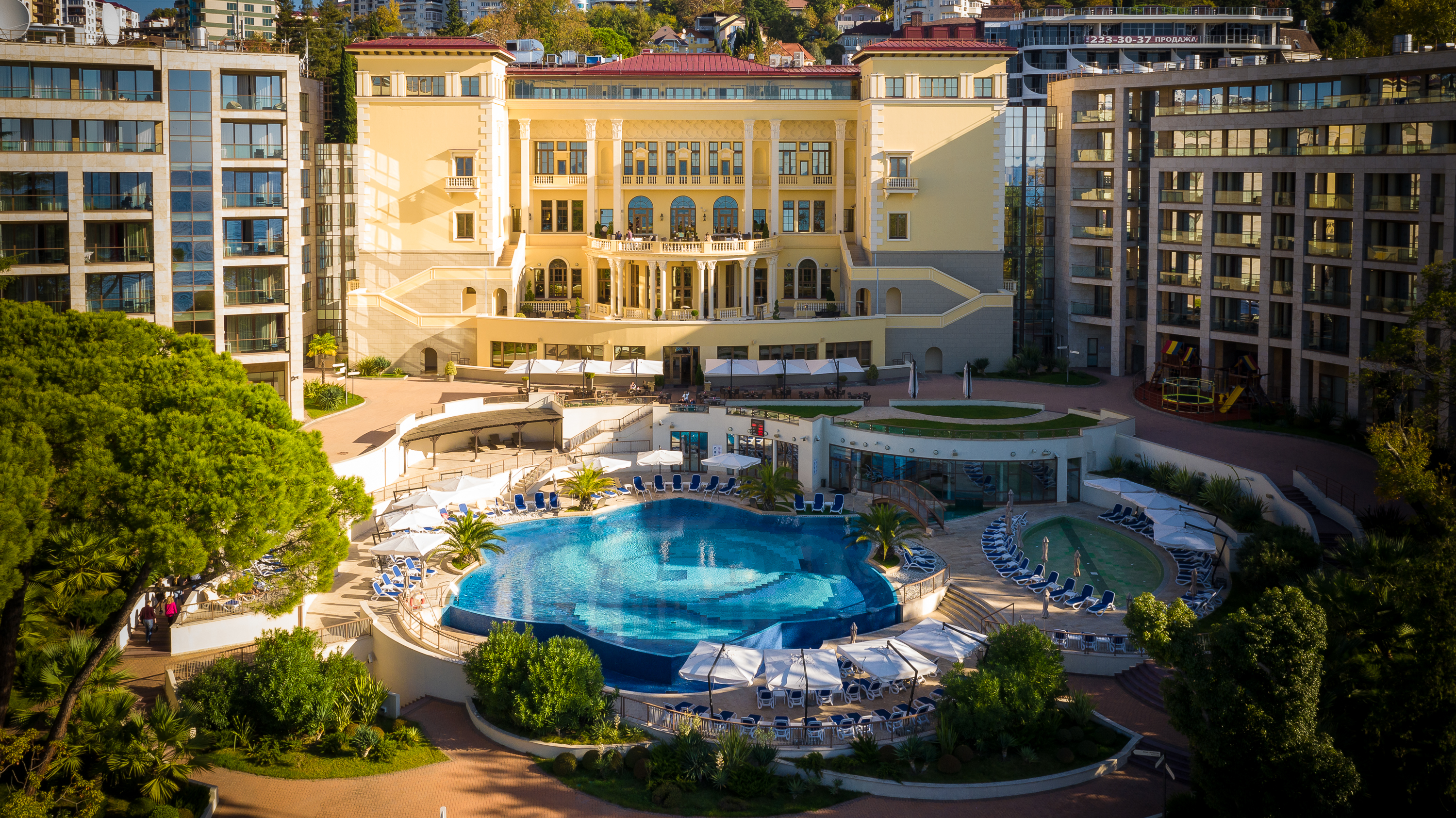
Swissôtel Resort Sochi Kamelia

Swissôtel currently has 39 properties worldwide. The company also offers Swissôtel Living serviced apartments in five properties (two as part of hotels and three standalones).

Includes hotel and Swissôtel Living.
Standalone Swissôtel Living property.

Properties in operation
No.	Property	Location	Country
1	Swissôtel Al Ghurair Dubai	Dubai	United Arab Emirates
2	Swissôtel Al Maqam Makkah	Mecca	Saudi Arabia
3	Swissôtel Al Murooj Dubai	Dubai	United Arab Emirates
4	Swissôtel Amsterdam	Amsterdam	Netherlands
5	Swissôtel Beijing Hong Kong Macau Center	Beijing	China
6	Swissôtel Büyük Efes	İzmir	Turkey
7	Swissôtel Chicago	Chicago	United States
8	Swissôtel Clark	Clark	Philippines
9	Swissôtel Damian Jasna	Demänovská Dolina	Slovakia
10	Swissôtel Foshan Guangdong	Foshan	China
11	Swissôtel Grand Shanghai	Shanghai	China
12	Swissôtel Jakarta PIK Avenue	Jakarta	Indonesia
13	Swissôtel Krasnye Holmy	Moscow	Russia
14	Swissôtel Kursaal Bern	Bern	Switzerland
15	Swissôtel Lima	Lima	Peru
16	Swissôtel Living Bodrum	Bodrum	Turkey
17	Swissôtel Living Jakarta Mega Kuningan	Jakarta	Indonesia
18	Swissôtel Living Jeddah	Jeddah	Saudi Arabia
19	Swissôtel Makkah	Mecca	Saudi Arabia
20	Swissôtel Nankai Osaka	Osaka	Japan
21	Swissôtel Nusantara	Nusantara	Indonesia
22	Swissôtel Poiana Brasov	Brașov	Romania
23	Swissôtel Quito	Quito	Ecuador
24	Swissôtel Resort & Spa Çeşme	Çeşme	Turkey
25	Swissôtel Resort Bodrum Beach	Bodrum	Turkey
26	Swissôtel Resort Changbaishan	Baishan	China
27	Swissôtel Resort Kolašin	Kolašin	Montenegro
28	Swissôtel Resort Sochi Kamelia	Sochi	Russia
29	Swissôtel Santa Cruz de la Sierra	Santa Cruz de la Sierra	Bolivia
30	Swissôtel Sarajevo	Sarajevo	Bosnia and Herzegovina
31	Swissôtel Sharm El Sheikh	Sharm El Sheikh	Egypt
32	Swissôtel Shenyang	Shenyang	China
33	Swissôtel Sydney	Sydney	Australia
34	Swissôtel Tallinn	Tallinn	Estonia
35	Swissôtel Tbilisi	Tbilisi	Georgia
36	Swissôtel The Bosphorus Istanbul	Istanbul	Turkey
37	Swissôtel The Stamford Singapore	Singapore	Singapore
38	Swissôtel Uludağ Bursa	Bursa	Turkey
39	Swissôtel Wellness Resort Alatau Almaty	Almaty	Kazakhstan

== Paolo Guerrero case ==
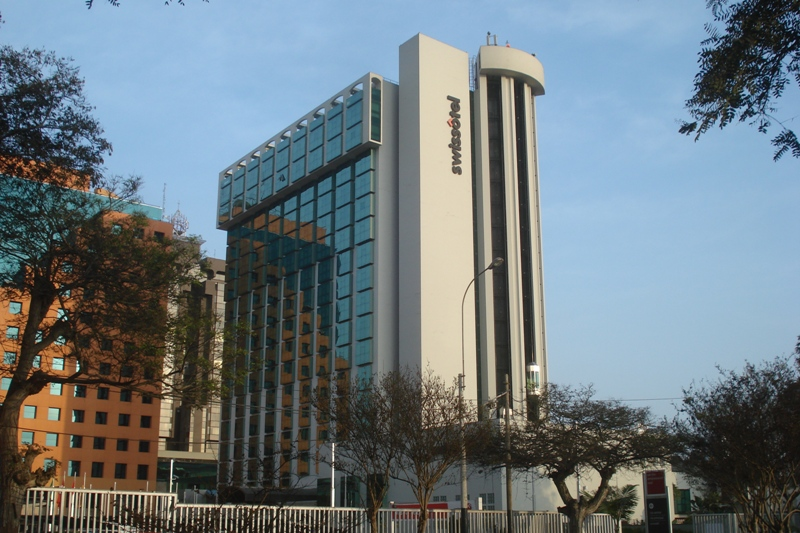
Swissôtel Lima

In November 2017, the Peruvian football player Paolo Guerrero tested positive for a metabolite of cocaine in the run up to the 2018 FIFA World Cup. His defence was that he had accidentally consumed the substance in herbal tea that was contaminated with coca tea at the Swissôtel in Lima, Peru.

Guerrero stated that the Swissôtel hindered him in obtaining evidence that was needed to sustain his case before the Court of Arbitration for Sport:

The hotel was an important factor that hurt me, that is very clear, when I came here to Peru to find the evidence of how this had been caused, the Swissotel turned its back on me, they did not support me at any time. What I wanted to know was the truth.

They threatened the waiter so he would not talk. At the hotel they did not allow us to talk to him.

In response, Peruvian citizens criticized Swissôtel, making negative comments in social networks like Facebook, Twitter and TripAdvisor, and calling for marches and boycotts against the hotel.
