= Pietro Canonica =

Italian painter (1869–1959)

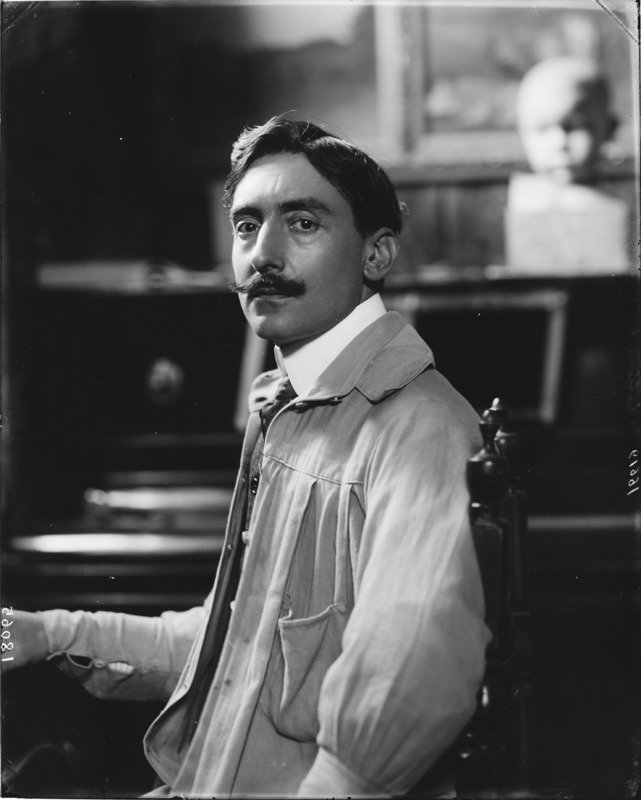
- Born: 1 March 1869; Moncalieri, Piedmont, Kingdom of Italy
- Died: 8 June 1959 (aged 90); Rome, Lazio, Italy
- Education: Accademia Albertina
- Known for: Sculpture; painting; opera composer
- Movement: Realism
- Patrons: Enrico Gamba; Odoardo Tabacchi

Pietro Canonica (1 March 1869 – 8 June 1959) was an Italian sculptor, painter, opera composer, professor of arts and senator for life.

== Biography ==
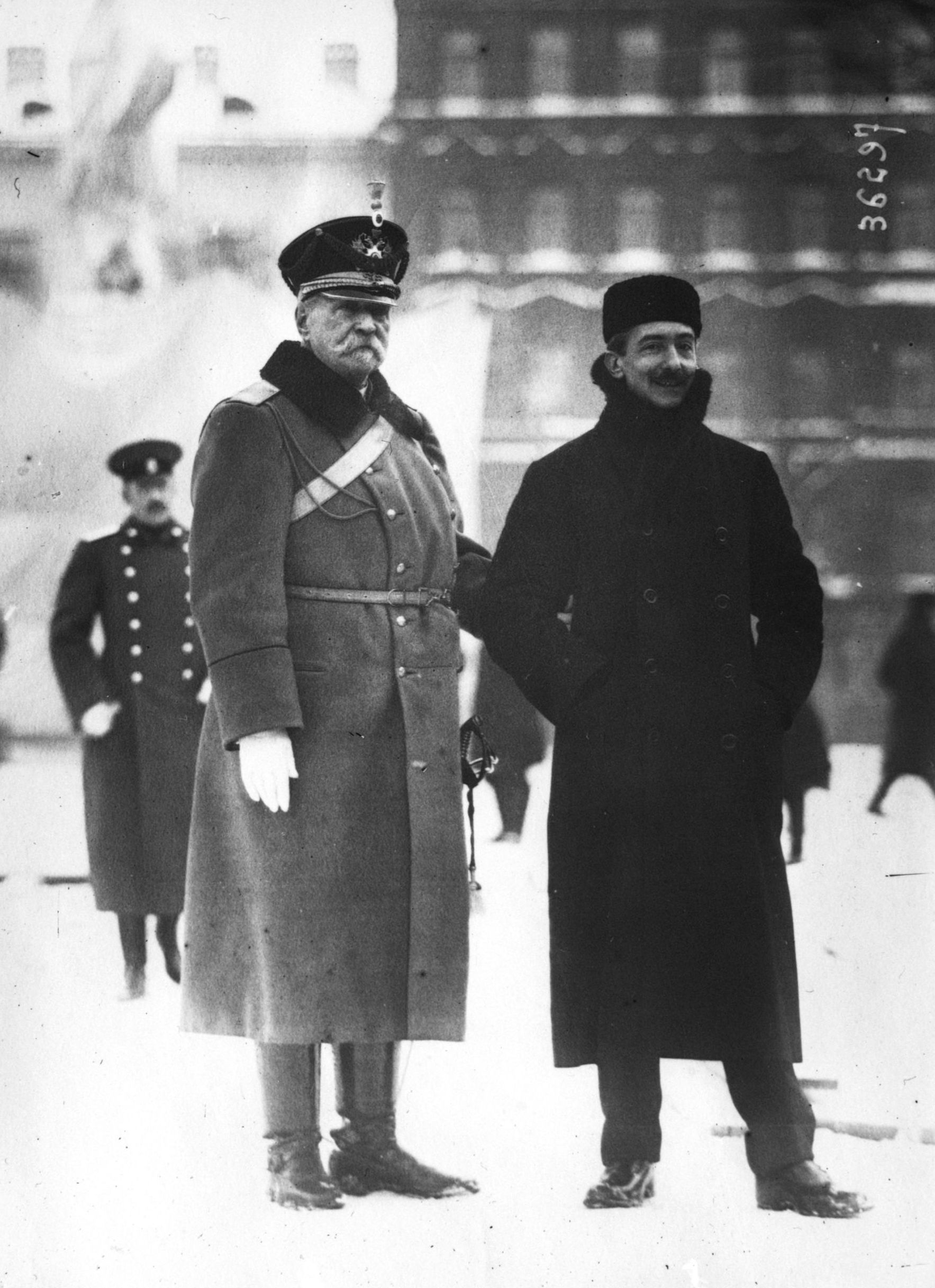
Canonica (on the right) with Dmitry Skalon, 1914

Canonica was born in Moncalieri, a town in the Province of Turin, northern Italy. His long and prestigious artistic career started at an early age when he became an assistant to Luca Gerosa at age ten. One year later, he was admitted to the Accademia Albertina di Belle Arti of Turin, where he was instructed by Enrico Gamba and Odoardo Tabacchi in making sculpture.

He initially adhered to the traditions of Naturalism, with Romantic and Renaissance influences, turned but later to Realism, without making concessions to the more avant-garde artistic tendencies of the 20th century. After World War II, Canonica devoted himself to more religious artworks.

He gained big success in the official environment of Turin for his civic and religious monuments. Following the formative period in Turin, he moved in 1922 to Rome, and participated in important national and international exhibitions in Milan, Rome, Venice, Paris, London, Berlin, Dresden, Monaco, Brussels and Saint Petersburg, and received official recognition. Commissioned by Italian and foreign aristocracy in European courts, Canonica created portraits and commemorative works. The master of equestrian sculpture also produced medallic art.

He was professor of sculpture at the Accademia di Belle Arti di Venezia (1910) and later at the Accademia di Belle Arti di Roma. He was in the first cadre of members named to the Royal Academy of Italy in 1929, and a member of the Accademia Nazionale di San Luca (1930).

In 1937, he managed to obtain the concession to renovate Villa Borghese, a 16th-century building owned by the City of Rome and used as administrative offices until it was abandoned in 1919 following a fire. In exchange of the promise to donate his artworks to the city, he was allowed to use the historical building as home and studio, which he repaired and decorated at his own expense. The unusual architectural construction within the Villa Borghese gardens, called also "La Fortezzuola", is a museum since 1961 dedicated to his name, exhibiting studies, models, sketches, casts and original works of the artist. His wife donated the valuable furnishings and paintings found in their private section after her death in 1987.

Canonica was also an accomplished musician and composed the operas La sposa di Corinto (1918), Miranda (1937), Enrico di Mirval, Impressioni, Sacra Terra and Medea (1959).

In 1950, Italian President Luigi Einaudi nominated him life senator for his outstanding artistic achievements. Canonica died on June 8, 1959, in Rome.

== Selected artworks ==
- Monument of an Artilleryman (marble and bronze, 1930) and a Cavalry soldier (bronze, 1923), both in Turin
- Bust of King Edward VII of England in Buckingham Palace, London, England (marble, 1903)
- Bust of Donna Franca Florio (marble, 1903–1904)
- Bust of princess Emily Doria-Pamphili in Galleria Nazionale d'Arte Moderna, Rome (marble, 1904)
- Monument to Grand Duke Nicholas Nikolaevich, Saint Petersburg, Russia (1913, destroyed in 1918 during the revolution)
- Model for the monument to Tsar Alexander II of Russia on horseback in Petrodvorets, Saint Petersburg, Russia (plaster, 1912–1914)
- Monument to Atatürk on horseback in front of the Ankara Ethnography Museum, Ankara, Turkey (1927)
- Monument to Atatürk in military uniform at Zafer Square, Ankara, Turkey (bronze and marble, 1927)
- Monument to Atatürk on horseback at Cumhuriyet (Republic) Square, İzmir, Turkey (bronze and marble, 1927)
- Monument of the Republic (Cumhuriyet Anıtı) at Taksim Square, Istanbul, Turkey (bronze and marble, 1928)
- Monument to Benedict XV in St. Peter's Basilica, Vatican (bronze and marble, 1928)
- Monument to Khedive Ismail, Alexandria, Egypt (1935)
- Tomb of Vittorio Emanuele Orlando, Rome (1935)
- Monument to Pius XI in the Lateran Palace, Rome (marble, 1941–1949)
- Monument to King Faysal I of Iraq on horseback, Baghdad, Iraq
- Monument to Simón Bolívar, Bogotá, Colombia
- Doors for the abbeys of Monte Cassino (1951) and Casamari (1959) near Rome
- "Il Tevere" fountain sculpture in the Centre William Rappard, Geneva, Switzerland (bronze, 1926)

=== Gallery ===
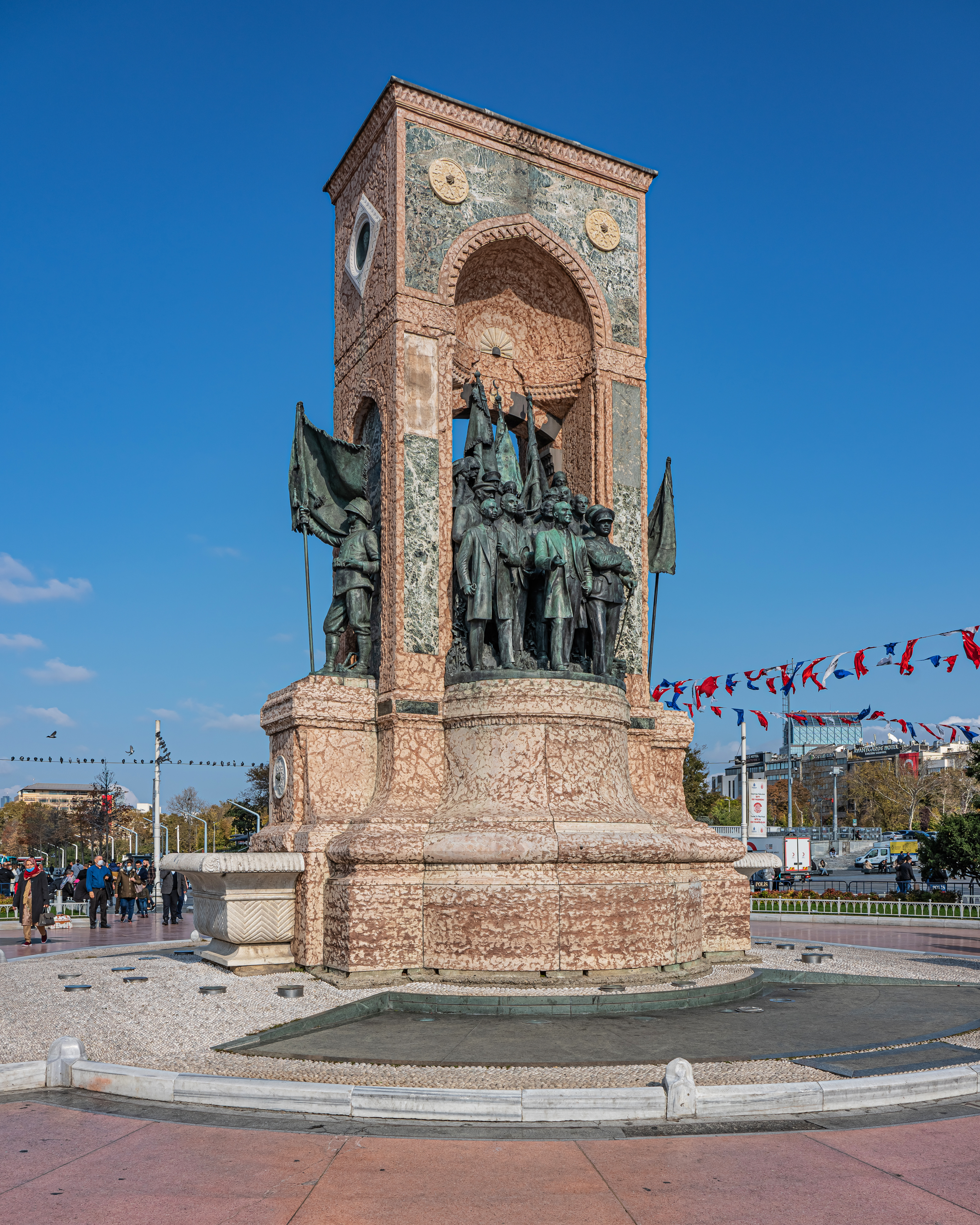
Monument of the Republic (Cumhuriyet Anıtı) in İstanbul, Turkey

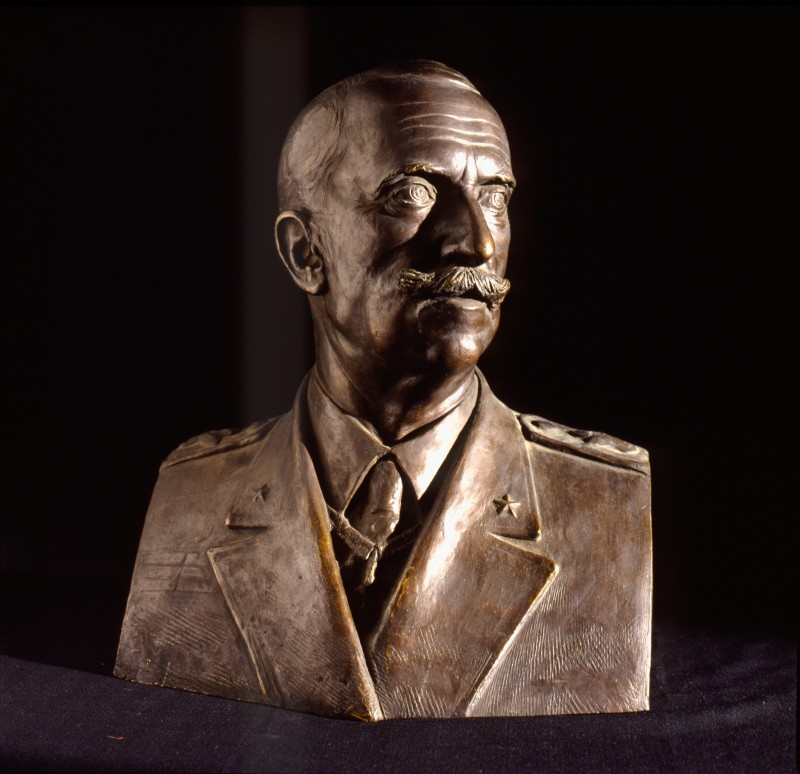
Vittorio Emanuele III, 1938

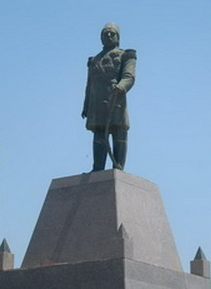
Isma'il Pasha Statue in Alexandria, Egypt

== Musical works ==
- La sposa di Corinto, opera in 3 acts, libretto by Carlo Bernardi (after Goethe), Rome, Teatro Argentina, 25 May 1918
- Miranda, opera in 3 acts, libretto by Carlo Bernardi and Pietro Canonica (after Shakespeare's The Tempest), Teatro del Casinò Municipale di Sanremo, 5 March 1937
- Enrico di Mirval, ovvero Amore è vita, opera, libretto by the composer, Sanremo, Teatro del Casinò Municipale, 1939
- Medea, tragedia lirica in 3 acts, libretto by the composer, (after Euripides), Rome, Teatro dell'Opera di Roma, 12 May 1953
- Sacra Terra, dramma lirico in 1 prologue and 3 acts, libretto by the composer (after Virgil's Aeneid), composed in 1957
- Impressioni, symphonic poem

== Bibliography ==
- Elena Lissoni, Pietro Canonica, online catalogue Artgate by Fondazione Cariplo, 2010, CC BY-SA.
