= FRHI Hotels & Resorts =

Hotel management company

- Type: Subsidiary
- Industry: Hotels; Resorts; Residences
- Founded: January 2006; 20 years ago
- Headquarters: Toronto, Ontario, Canada
- Number of locations: 105 hotels (as of October 2013)
- Area served: Worldwide
- Number of employees: 42,000 (2013)
- Parent: AccorHotels (2016-present)
- Website: www.frhi.com

FRHI Hotels & Resorts (previously known as Fairmont Raffles Hotels International) is a global hotel management company that is based in Toronto, Ontario, Canada. FRHI is the parent company that manages three brands of hotels: Fairmont, Raffles and Swissôtel. These hotel chains collectively include more than 100 hotels and resorts in over 30 countries worldwide. Since 2016, the company has been owned by AccorHotels, a French multinational hotel firm. AccorHotels purchased FRHI for $2.7 billion.

== History ==
=== Pre FRHI ===
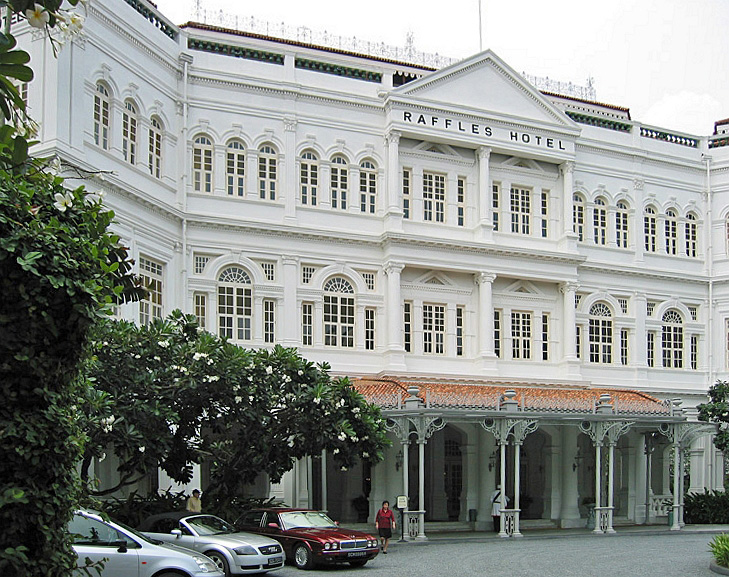
Raffles Hotel in Singapore

Established in 1989 to oversee the restoration of the historic Raffles Hotel in Singapore and the restructuring of Raffles City, the Raffles hotel company reopened its flagship hotel on September 16, 1991.

The company purchased the Swissôtel chain in 2001, and it took over the then Westin Stamford and Westin Plaza (both in Singapore) as the contracts expired at the end of the year. On January 1, 2002, the two hotels were renamed Swissôtel The Stamford and Raffles The Plaza (now Fairmont Singapore), respectively, following refurbishment.

Former owner Raffles Holdings announced the sale of the chain on July 18, 2005, to Colony Capital, effective October 1, 2005. The sale included its 41 hotels and resorts, as well as hotels under development. This included the landmark Raffles Hotel in Singapore, which is on a 100-year lease to Colony Capital. However, Raffles City was owned by Raffles Holdings under Tincel Properties Pte Ltd when it was sold, and it was eventually sold to CapitaCommercial Trust and CapitaMall Trust in July 2006.

Fairmont Hotels and Resorts originated from two hotel businesses established in the late 19th century: the Canadian Pacific Limited-owned Canadian Pacific Hotels & Resorts and Fairmont Hotels. In 1999, Canadian Pacific Hotels acquired a majority interest in Fairmont Hotels, with Canadian Pacific Hotels later renaming its entire hotel portfolio under the Fairmont Hotels & Resorts banner in 2001. Shortly after the hotel division was renamed, Canadian Pacific Limited was split into several smaller companies in a starburst move, with Fairmont becoming a separately traded company.

=== As FRHI ===
FRHI was formed in January 2006, when Fairmont Hotels and Resorts was acquired by Colony Capital, who subsequently entered into a joint venture with the Kingdom Holding Company; consolidating Fairmont with their other hotel brands, Raffles and Swissôtel to form Fairmont Raffles Hotels International (FRHI).

The company also owned Delta Hotels at one point, but it sold that hotel management company in October 2007 to bcIMC, a Crown corporation owned by the Government of British Columbia. In 2015, Delta Hotels was purchased by Marriott International.

Voyager Partners, a Qatari Diar affiliate, subsequently acquired a majority interest in FRHI in April 2010. In December 2015, AccorHotels announced that it would be purchasing FRHI in a US$2.9 billion deal, which was completed in 2016.
