= Republic Monument =

Monument in Taksim Square, Istanbul, Turkey

- Cumhuriyet Anıtı
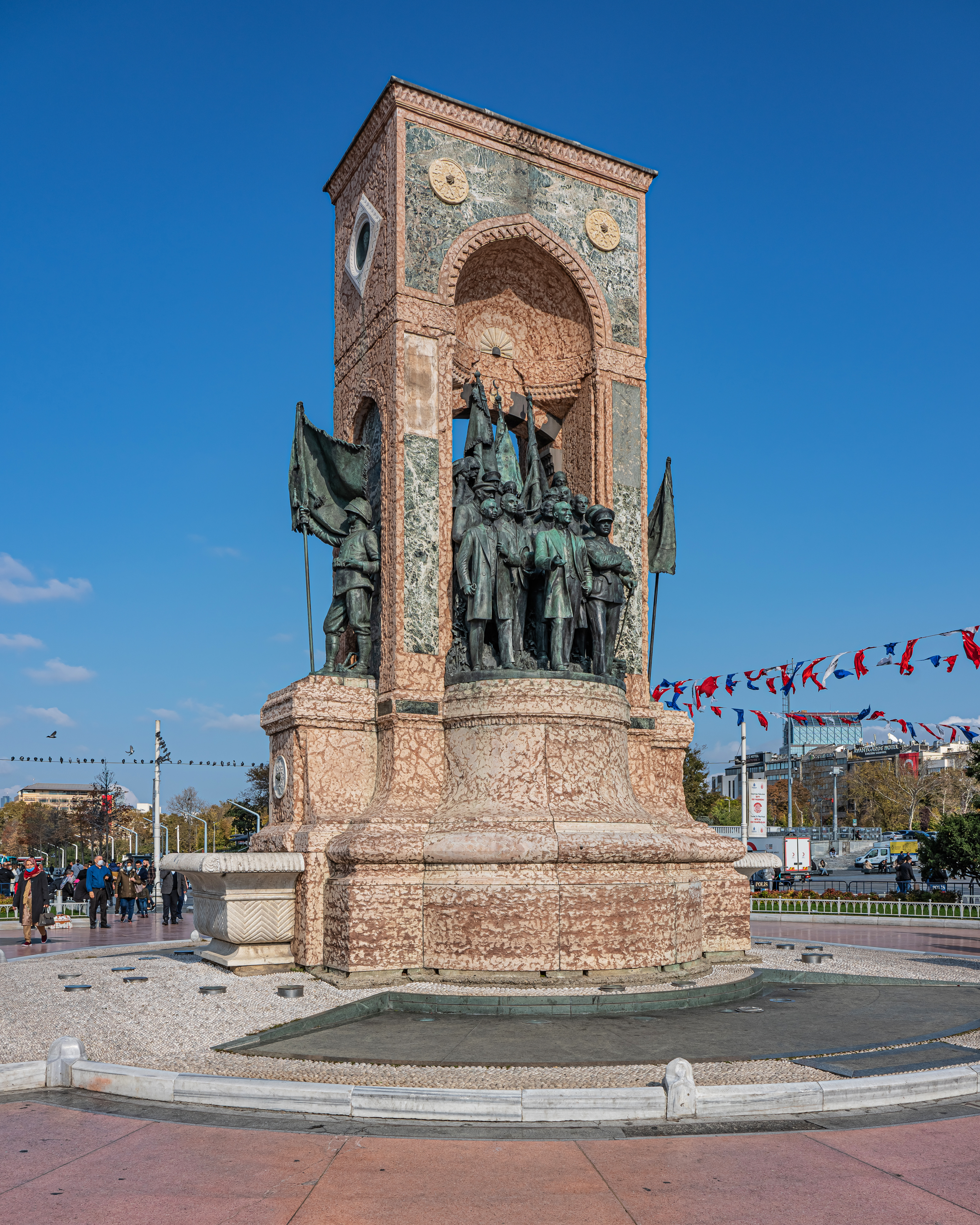
- The Republic Monument
- Interactive map of Republic Monument
- Location: Taksim Square in Istanbul, Turkey
- Coordinates: 41°02′13″N 28°59′06″E
- Designer: Pietro Canonica
- Material: Bronze figures in marble structure
- Height: 11 m (36 ft)
- Opening date: August 8, 1928
- Dedicated to: the foundation of the Turkish Republic

The Republic Monument (Turkish: Cumhuriyet Anıtı) is a notable monument located at Taksim Square in Istanbul, Turkey, to commemorate the formation of the Turkish Republic in 1923.

Designed by Italian sculptor Pietro Canonica and built in two and a half years with financial support from the population, it was unveiled by Dr. Hakkı Şinasi Pasha on August 8, 1928.

The 11 m (36 ft) high monument portrays the founders of the Turkish Republic, with prominent depictions of Mustafa Kemal Atatürk, İsmet İnönü and Fevzi Çakmak. The monument has two sides: the side facing north depicts Atatürk in military uniform during the Turkish War of Independence, while the side facing south (towards İstiklal Avenue) has Atatürk and his comrades dressed in modern Western clothing; the former symbolizing his role as military commander-in-chief, and the latter symbolizing his role as statesman.

Semyon Ivanovich Aralov, Ambassador of the Russian SFSR in Ankara during the Turkish War of Independence, is among the group of people behind Atatürk (his figure wears a cap and stands behind İsmet İnönü, on the southern facade of the monument). His presence in the monument, ordered by Atatürk, points out to the financial and military aid sent by Vladimir Lenin in 1920, during the Turkish War of Independence (1919–1922).

Cumhuriyet Anıtı is an important site, where official ceremonies on national holidays are being held.

== See also ==
- List of public art in Istanbul
