= List of hotels in Canada =

This is a list of notable hotels in Canada.

== Alberta ==
- Banff Springs Hotel, Banff
- Chateau Lacombe Hotel, Edmonton
- Chateau Lake Louise, Lake Louise
- Coast Edmonton House, Edmonton
- Fairmont Palliser Hotel, Calgary
- Hotel Macdonald, Edmonton
- Jasper Park Lodge, Jasper
- Prince of Wales Hotel, Waterton Lakes National Park
- The Rimrock Resort Hotel, Banff

== British Columbia ==
- Empire Landmark Hotel, Vancouver
- The Empress, Victoria
- Fairmont Pacific Rim, Vancouver
- Hotel Europe, Vancouver
- Hotel Georgia, Vancouver
- Hotel Vancouver, Vancouver
- Hyatt Regency Vancouver
- The Listel Hotel, Vancouver
- Living Shangri-La, Vancouver
- The Melville, Vancouver
- Sheraton Wall Centre, Vancouver
- Sylvia Hotel, Vancouver

== Manitoba ==
- Fort Garry Hotel, Winnipeg

== New Brunswick ==
- The Algonquin, St. Andrews
- Crowne Plaza Fredericton – Lord Beaverbrook, Fredericton

== Newfoundland and Labrador ==
- Hotel Newfoundland, St. John's

== Northwest Territories ==
- Explorer Hotel, Yellowknife
- The Gold Range, Yellowknife

== Nova Scotia ==
- Digby Pines Resort, Digby
- Lord Nelson Hotel, Halifax
- The Westin Nova Scotian, Halifax

== Ontario ==
- Caesars Windsor, Windsor
- Château Laurier, Ottawa
- Chelsea Hotel, Toronto
- Drake Hotel, Toronto
- Duke of York Hotel, Toronto
- Fairmont Royal York, Toronto
- Ford Hotel, Toronto
- Four Seasons Hotel Toronto, Toronto
- Gladstone Hotel, Toronto
- Guild Inn, Toronto
- Hotel Waverly, Toronto
- Inn on the Park, Toronto
- InterContinental Toronto Centre, Toronto
- John Finch's Hotel, Toronto
- King Edward Hotel, Toronto
- Lord Elgin Hotel, Ottawa
- Lord Simcoe Hotel, Toronto
- Marriott Niagara Falls Hotel Fallsview & Spa, Niagara Falls
- Marriott on the Falls Hotel, Niagara Falls
- Miller Tavern, Toronto
- New Broadview House Hotel, Toronto
- New Edwin Hotel, Toronto
- Niagara Fallsview Casino Resort, Niagara Falls
- Old Mill Inn & Spa, Toronto
- Ottawa Marriott Hotel, Ottawa
- Park Hyatt Toronto, Toronto
- Prince Arthur Hotel, Thunder Bay
- Radisson Toronto East Hotel, Toronto
- Regal Constellation Hotel, Toronto
- Rossin House Hotel, Toronto
- Russell House, Ottawa
- Sheraton Centre Toronto Hotel, Toronto
- Sheraton on the Falls, Niagara Falls
- Spadina Hotel, Toronto
- Union Hotel, Toronto
- Westin Harbour Castle Hotel, Toronto
- Windsor Arms Hotel, Toronto

== Prince Edward Island ==
- Dalvay-by-the-Sea, Prince Edward Island National Park
- Hotel Charlottetown, Charlottetown

== Quebec ==
- Auberge Le Saint-Gabriel, Montreal
- Chateau Aeroport-Mirabel, Mirabel
- Château Champlain, Montreal
- Château Frontenac, Quebec City
- Château Montebello, Montebello
- Clarendon Hotel, Quebec City
- Hovey Manor, North Hatley
- Ice Hotel, Quebec City
- Laurentian Hotel, Montreal
- Le Centre Sheraton Montreal Hotel, Montreal
- Les Cours Mont-Royal, Montreal
- Manoir Richelieu, La Malbaie
- Ottawa Hotel, Montreal, Montreal
- Place Viger, Montreal
- Queen Elizabeth Hotel, Montreal
- Ritz-Carlton Montreal, Montreal
- Windsor Hotel, Montreal

== Saskatchewan ==
- Chateau Qu'Appelle, Regina
- Delta Bessborough, Saskatoon
- Hotel Saskatchewan, Regina
- Hotel Senator, Saskatoon
- Radisson Hotel Saskatoon, Saskatoon
- Temple Gardens Mineral Spa Resort, Moose Jaw

== Yukon ==
- Downtown Hotel, Dawson City

== See also ==
- List of defunct hotels in Canada
