= Grand railway hotels of Canada =

Railway hotels built across Canada

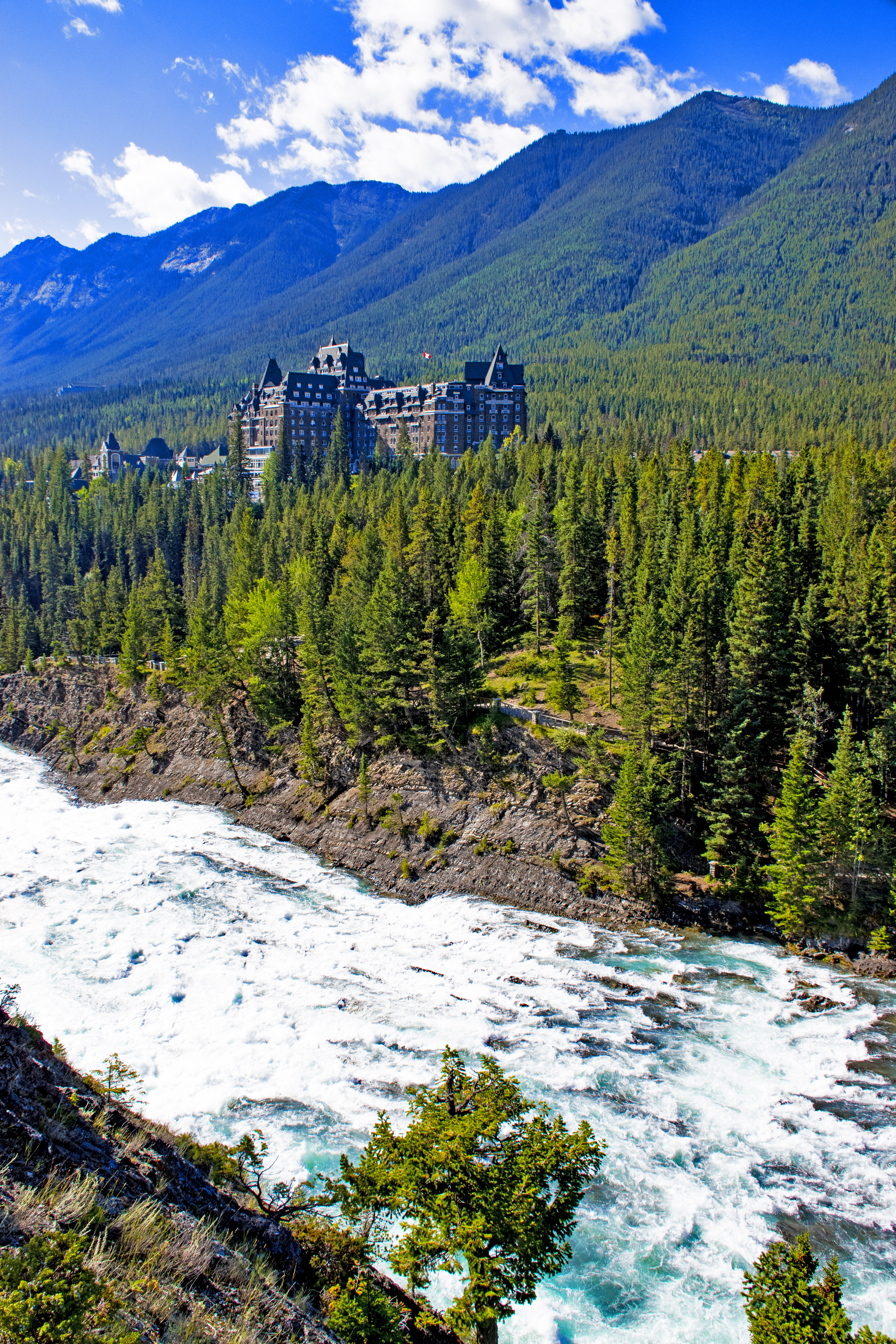
Banff Springs Hotel is one of several grand railway hotels built across the country.

Canada's grand railway hotels are a series of railway hotels across the country, each a local and national landmark, and most of which are icons of Canadian history and architecture; some are considered to be the grand hotels of the British Empire. Each hotel was originally built by the Canadian railway companies, or the railways acted as a catalyst for the hotel's construction. The hotels were designed to serve the passengers of the country's then expanding rail network, and they celebrated rail travel in style.

== Architecture ==
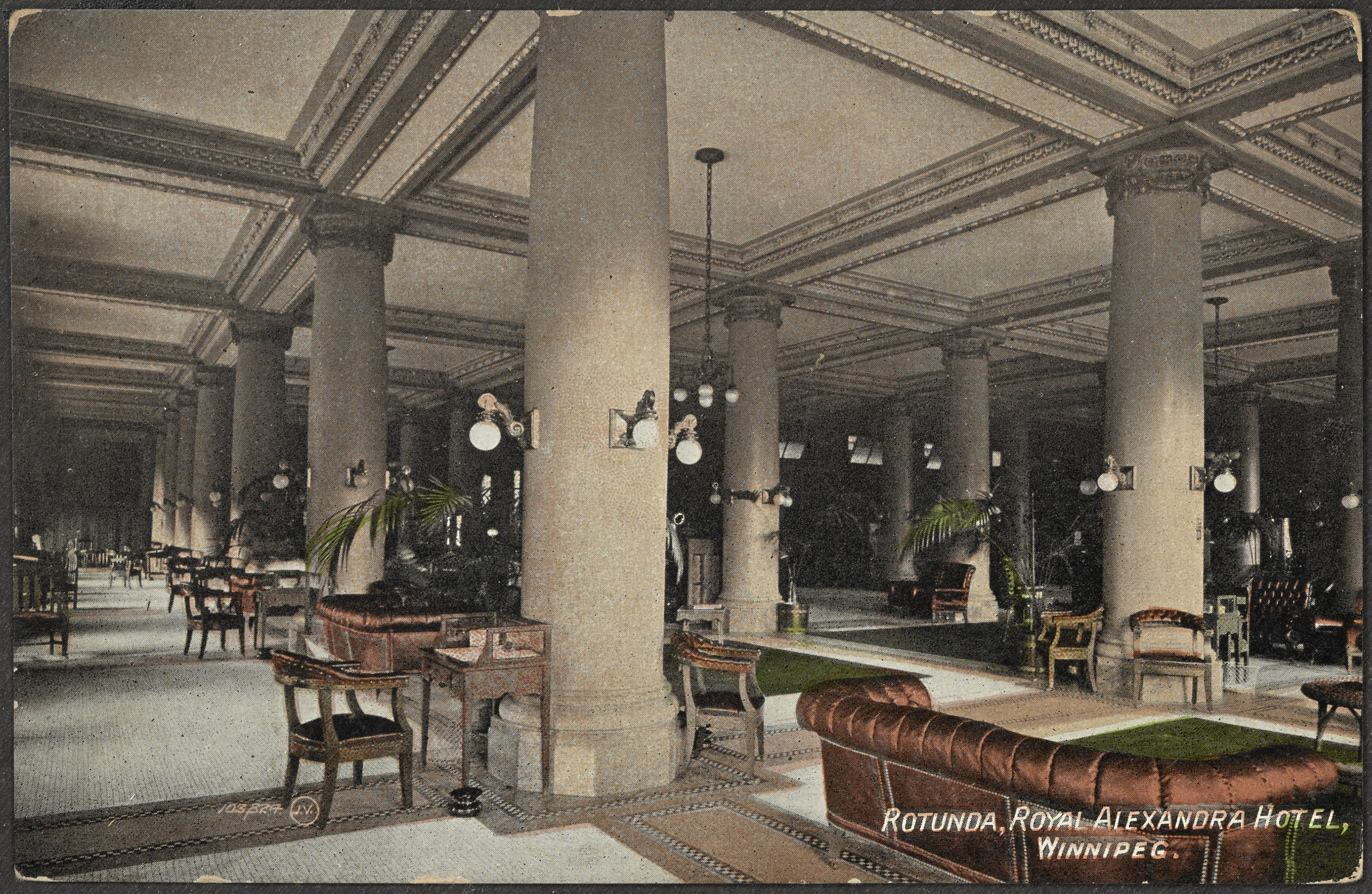
Interior rotunda view of the Royal Alexandra Hotel in Winnipeg

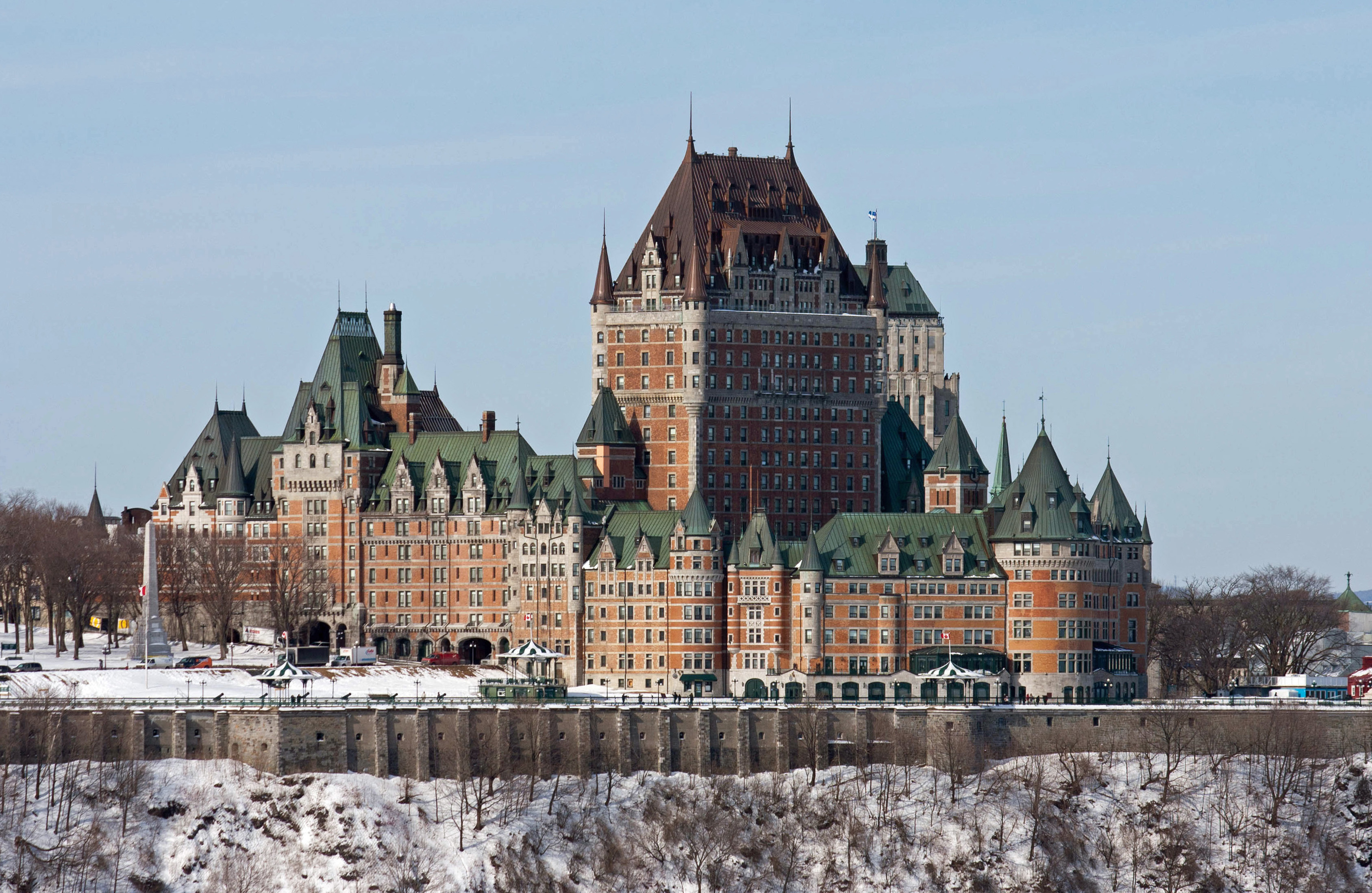
The Château Frontenac is an early example of a Canadian Châteauesque-styled hotel. The style was used for many of Canada's railway hotels.

Many of the railway hotels were built in the Château style (also termed the "Neo-château" or "Châteauesque" style), which as a result became known as a distinctly Canadian form of architecture. The use of towers and turrets, and other Scottish baronial and French château architectural elements, became a signature style of Canada's majestic hotels. Architects also used the style for important public buildings, such as the Confederation and Justice buildings in Ottawa.

In later years, the railway companies departed from the Château style for some of their properties, notably with the construction of Winnipeg's Royal Alexandra Hotel in 1906; the Palliser Hotel in Calgary, built in 1914; and the elaborate second Hotel Vancouver, designed in grand Italianate style, unlike any of the previous Canadian railway hotels.

== History ==
Canada's first grand railway hotel, the Windsor Hotel in Montreal, opened in 1878. Although it was not owned by a railway company, it was built to serve railway visitors from nearby Windsor Station. Given its location next to Montreal's main train station, the Windsor served for years as the permanent residence of executives of both the Canadian Pacific Railway (CPR) and Grand Trunk Railway.

The railways' development role in the construction and operation of large hotels was inaugurated with Canadian Pacific Railway's opening of the Hotel Vancouver on May 16, 1888. This was the first of three railway-owned hotels by that name in Vancouver. Two weeks later, the Canadian Pacific Railway officially opened the Banff Springs Hotel on June 1, 1888. The president of the Canadian Pacific Railway, William Cornelius Van Horne, had personally chosen the site in the Rocky Mountains for the new hotel. He envisioned a string of grand hotels across Canada that would draw visitors from abroad to his railway. Van Horne famously remarked: "If we can't export the scenery, we'll import the tourists." The original Banff Springs Hotel, of wooden construction, was destroyed by fire in 1926 and replaced by the present structure.

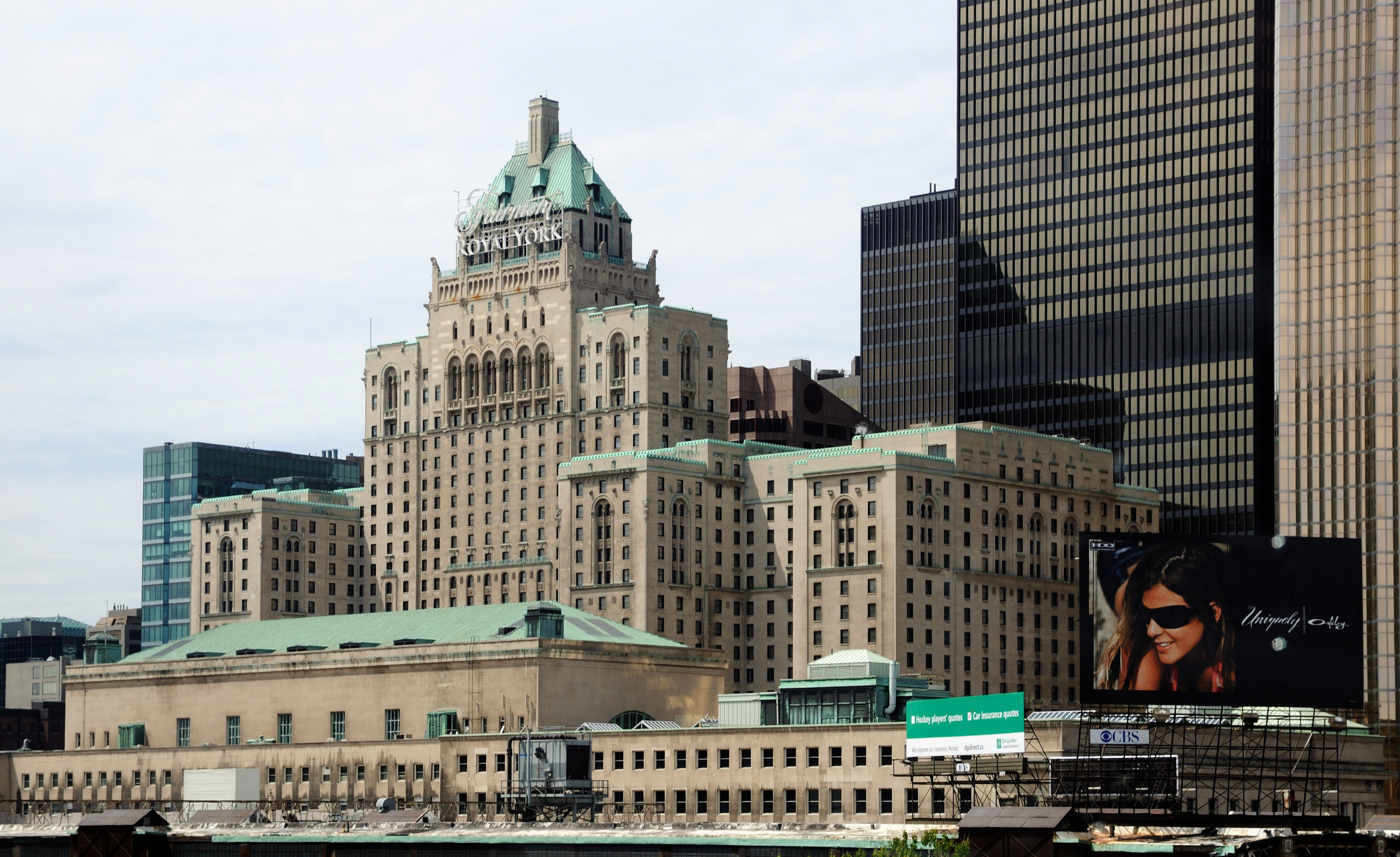
Situated in Downtown Toronto, the Royal York is the largest railway hotel built in Canada.

Canadian Pacific next built the Château Frontenac in Quebec City, which quickly came to be the symbol of the city. It was designed to rival any hotel in Europe. Its elevated location overlooking the city also made it a readily identifiable landmark as viewed from passing trains as well as ships plying the waters of the Saint Lawrence River en route to or from Montreal. Place Viger followed in Montreal, followed by The Empress in Victoria, British Columbia, and the Château Lake Louise in Alberta. The largest of the railway hotels is the Royal York in Toronto, which opened in 1929.

The main competitor to Canadian Pacific, the Grand Trunk Railway, was not prepared to leave the field solely to its rival. It also determined to build a chain of luxury hotels across the country, which it did in the château style. The GTR built the Château Laurier in Ottawa in 1912, with the Fort Garry Hotel in Winnipeg and the Hotel Macdonald in Edmonton following in 1913 and 1915 respectively.

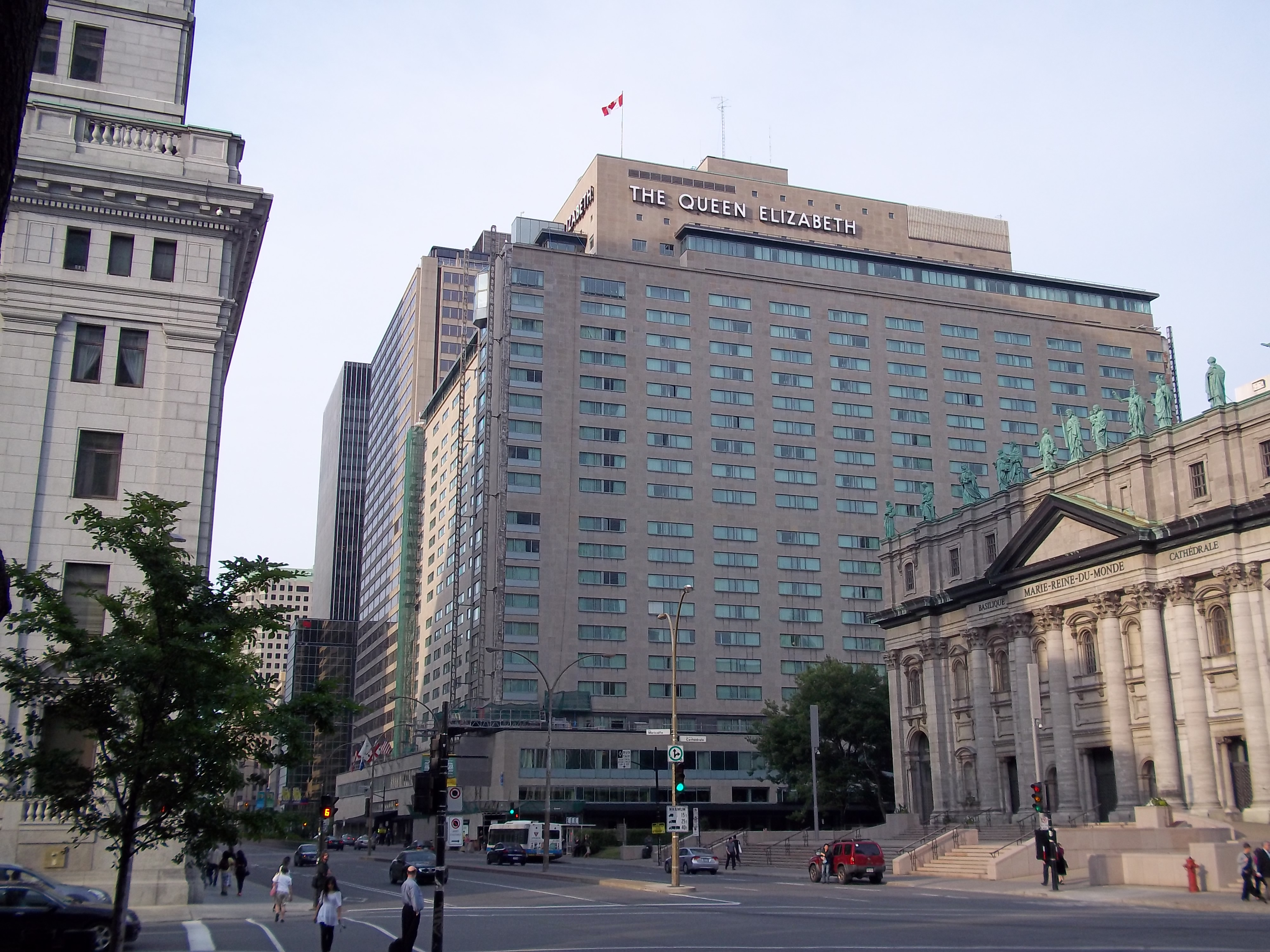
Opened in 1958, the Queen Elizabeth Hotel was the last railway hotel built in Canada.

The GTR was amalgamated into the Canadian National Railway (CNR) in 1920. During the decades that followed, the hotel divisions of CPR and CNR, Canadian National Hotels and Canadian Pacific Hotels, continued to expand their competing hotel chains across the country. The Queen Elizabeth Hotel in Montreal, built in 1958 over that city's Central Station, was perhaps the last true railway hotel built in Canada. Both railways continued to open new establishments in subsequent years, although none had any connection to the railways, except through their ownership.

In 1988, Canadian Pacific acquired Canadian National Hotels. For the first time, many of Canada's railway hotels were operated by the same company. In 2001, Canadian Pacific Hotels was renamed Fairmont Hotels and Resorts, using the name of an American company it had purchased in 1999. Fairmont continues to operate most of Canada's landmark hotels (see Canadian Pacific Hotels).

== Inventory ==
The majority of Canada's grand railway hotels were built by three railway companies, Canadian National Railway, Canadian Pacific Railway, and Grand Trunk Railway.

=== Canadian National Railway ===
The following are grand railway hotels built for Canadian National Railway, and its hotel division Canadian National Hotels.

Name	Year opened	Location	Architect	Status	Photo
Grand Beach Hotel	1920	Grand Marais, Manitoba	John Schofield	Demolished in 1962	
Hotel Charlottetown	1931	Charlottetown, Prince Edward Island	John Schofield, G. F. Drummond	Operated by Rodd Hotels and Resorts	
Hotel Vancouver (third) (Note: Although the hotel was initially developed by Canadian National Railways, its completion required the company to partner with rival Canadian Pacific Railways. The hotel was jointly managed by both companies until Canadian National Railways acquired full ownership of the hotel in 1962.)	1939	Vancouver, British Columbia	Archibald and Schofield	Operated by Fairmont Hotels and Resorts.	
Jasper Park Lodge	1922	Jasper, Alberta	George Macdonald Lang (1921 complex); John Schofield (additions after 1924); George Drummond (1952 rebuild)	Burned down in 1952. Rebuilt in 1953. Operated by Fairmont Hotels and Resorts.	
Queen Elizabeth Hotel	1958	Montreal, Quebec	George Drummond	Operated by Fairmont Hotels and Resorts.	
The Bessborough	1935	Saskatoon, Saskatchewan	Archibald and Schofield	Operated by Delta Hotels.	
The Nova Scotian	1930	Halifax, Nova Scotia	Archibald and Schofield	Operated by Westin Hotels & Resorts.	

=== Canadian Pacific Railway ===
The following are grand railway hotels built for Canadian Pacific Railway, and its hotel division Canadian Pacific Hotels.

Name	Year opened	Location	Architect	Status	Photo
The Algonquin	1889	St. Andrew's, New Brunswick	Rand & Taylor (1899 hotel); Barott Blackadder and Webster (1915 hotel)	Purchased by CPR in 1903. Original building burned down in 1914. The current building opened a year later. Operated by New Castle Hotels & Resorts.	
Banff Springs Hotel	1888	Banff, Alberta	Bruce Price (original) Walter Painter (tower) John Orrock (main block)	Operated by Fairmont Hotels and Resorts	
Cameron Lake Chalet	1912	Cameron Lake, British Columbia		Closed 1966	
Château Champlain	1966	Montreal, Quebec	Roger d'Astous, Jean-Paul Pothier	Operated by Marriott	
Château Frontenac	1893	Quebec City, Quebec	Bruce Price	Operated by Fairmont Hotels and Resorts	
Château Lake Louise	1890	Lake Louise, Alberta	Thomas Sorby (1899–1901 additions); Francis Rattenbury (1902–06 additions); Walter Painter (1906–11 additions, 1912 wing); Barott & Blackader (1924 wing)	Operated by Fairmont Hotels and Resorts	
Château Montebello	1930	Montebello, Quebec	Lawson and Little, with Edwin S. Kent and George W. White	Operated by Fairmont Hotels and Resorts	
Emerald Lake Lodge	1902	Emerald Lake, British Columbia	Possibly Thomas Charles Sorby	Operated by Canadian Rocky Mountain Resorts	
Empress Hotel	1908	Winnipeg Beach, Manitoba	Hooper & Walker	Developed by Edward Windebank but sold to the CPR during construction. Burned down in 1935.	
Fraser Canyon House	1897	North Bend, British Columbia	Thomas Charles Sorby	Burned down in 1927	
Glacier House	1887	Glacier National Park, British Columbia	Thomas Charles Sorby, 1902 addition by Francis Rattenbury	Demolished in 1929	
Hotel Incola	1912	Penticton, British Columbia	Arthur Freeman Pelton	Demolished in 1980	
Hotel Saskatchewan	1927	Regina, Saskatchewan	Ross and Macdonald	Operated by Marriott International	
Hotel Vancouver (first)	1888	Vancouver, British Columbia	Thomas Charles Sorby	Demolished in 1912	
Hotel Vancouver (second)	1916	Vancouver, British Columbia	Francis S. Swales	Demolished in 1949	
Hotel Sicamous	1900	Sicamous, British Columbia	Edward Maxwell	Demolished in 1964	
Hotel Revelstoke	1897	Revelstoke, British Columbia	Francis Rattenbury	Closed in 1927 and dismantled in 1928	
Kootenay Lake Hotel	1911	Balfour, British Columbia	William Wallace Blair	Demolished in 1929	
McAdam Hotel	1901	McAdam, New Brunswick	Edward Maxwell	Hotel closed in 1959. Building now operates as a museum.	
Mount Stephen House	1886	Field, British Columbia	Thomas Charles Sorby, 1901 addition by Francis Rattenbury	Demolished in 1963.	
Palliser Hotel	1914	Calgary, Alberta	E. and W.S. Maxwell	Operated by Fairmont Hotels and Resorts.	
Place Viger	1898	Montreal, Quebec	Bruce Price	Hotel closed in 1935. Now used as office building.	
Royal Alexandra Hotel	1911	Winnipeg, Manitoba	E. and W. S. Maxwell	Hotel closed in 1967. Demolished in 1971.	
Royal York	1929	Toronto, Ontario	Ross and Macdonald; Sproatt and Rolph	Operated by Fairmont Hotels and Resorts.	
The Empress	1908	Victoria, British Columbia	Francis Rattenbury	Operated by Fairmont Hotels and Resorts.	

=== Dominion Atlantic Railway ===
The Dominion Atlantic Railway was purchased by the CPR in 1911, however, it retained its operational independence.

Name	Year opened	Location	Architect	Status	Photo
Cornwallis Inn	1930	Kentville, Nova Scotia	John Wilson Orrock and Colin M. Drewitt		
Digby Pines	1905; 1929	Digby, Nova Scotia		Railway purchased the hotel in 1917, rebuilt in 1929. Independently operated.	
Lakeside Inn	1931	Yarmouth, Nova Scotia	John Wilson Orrock and Colin M. Drewitt	Hotel closed in 1960; now the Villa Saint-Joseph du Lac	
Lord Nelson Hotel	1927	Halifax, Nova Scotia	O. C. Gross	Operated independently.	

=== Grand Trunk Railway ===
The following are grand railway hotels built for Grand Trunk Railway and its western subsidiary, Grand Trunk Pacific Railway.

Name	Year opened	Location	Architect	Status	Photo
Château Laurier	1912	Ottawa, Ontario	Bradford Gilbert, Ross and Macfarlane	Operated by Fairmont Hotels and Resorts.	
Fort Garry Hotel	1913	Winnipeg, Manitoba	Ross and Macdonald	Operated independently.	
Highland Inn	1908	Algonquin Park, Ontario		Closed in 1954. Demolished in 1957.	
Hotel Macdonald	1915	Edmonton, Alberta	Ross and Macfarlane	Operated by Fairmont Hotels and Resorts.	
Minaki Lodge	1914	Minaki, Ontario	George Carruthers Briggs	Burned down in 2003	

=== Great Northern Railway ===
Name	Year opened	Location	Architect	Status	Photo
Prince of Wales Hotel	1927	Waterton, Alberta	Thomas D. McMahon	Operated by Pursuit Collection	

=== Newfoundland Railway ===
The Newfoundland Railway was purchased by CN 1949; it retained its operational independence as part of Terra Transport.

Name	Year opened	Location	Architect	Status	Photo
Hotel Newfoundland	1926	St. John's, Newfoundland	Sir Aston Webb	Demolished in 1983; replaced with a new hotel by Fairmont Hotels	

=== Unexecuted projects ===
Name	Location	Architect	Railway	Notes	Image
Campanile Hotel	Victoria, British Columbia	Francis Rattenbury	Grand Trunk Pacific Railway	Was to be built on the current site of the Royal British Columbia Museum. In January 1913, construction was said to be starting that spring. Project revived in 1928 but cancelled at the start of the Great Depression.	
Château Miette	Miette, Alberta	Francis Rattenbury	Grand Trunk Pacific Railway	A 250-room hotel. Design included a centre block flanked by two three-storey wings.	
Château Mount Robson	Mount Robson, British Columbia	Francis Rattenbury	Grand Trunk Pacific Railway	Rattenbury devised two concepts for the hotel. The first had a low central block with six three-storey bedroom wings radiating out. The second was a tower block similar in design to the Empress. The former appears to have been preferred.	
Château Prince Rupert	Prince Rupert, British Columbia	Francis Rattenbury	Grand Trunk Pacific Railway	To have had a main block of 12 storeys with two nine-storey wings. Foundation trenches dug in 1913, project then abandoned. The development was also to include ocean and railway terminals.	
Château Qu'Appelle	Regina, Saskatchewan	Ross and Macdonald	Grand Trunk Pacific Railway		
Fort George Hotel	Prince George, British Columbia	Holabird & Roche	Grand Trunk Pacific Railway		
Hotel Vancouver	Vancouver, British Columbia	Francis Rattenbury	Canadian Pacific Railway	In 1900, Rattenbury designed a château-style hotel to replace Sorby's 1888 building. The design was later adapted for The Empress. He redesigned the project in 1902 in a Renaissance style. One wing of this was built.	
Hotel Vancouver	Vancouver, British Columbia	Warren and Wetmore	Canadian National Railway	In 1926 Warren and Wetmore designed a $5 million hotel for the CNR. Their design was passed over for that of John S. Archibald (see Hotel Vancouver).	
Donaldson Hotel	Willow River, British Columbia	Holabird & Roche	Grand Trunk Pacific Railway		
Glacier House	Glacier, British Columbia	John Thomas Alexander	Canadian Pacific Railway	After the Glacier House resort closed in 1925, in 1926 the railway planned a new, five-storey, Château-style hotel on the site. That same year, architect Alexander designed an addition to the Banff Springs.	
Mountain Inn	Jasper, Alberta	Francis Rattenbury	Grand Trunk Pacific Railway	Likely intended for the site that was later used for the Jasper Park Lodge.	
Winnipeg Hotel	Winnipeg, Manitoba	Edward Maxwell	Canadian Pacific Railway	A station-hotel similar to the Place Viger. Designed by Maxwell in 1899 and drafted by David MacFarlane. Four years later the Royal Alexandra Hotel was built instead.	
