= Calgary station =

Railway station in Calgary, Alberta

Coordinates: 51.044292°N 114.063138°W

Calgary
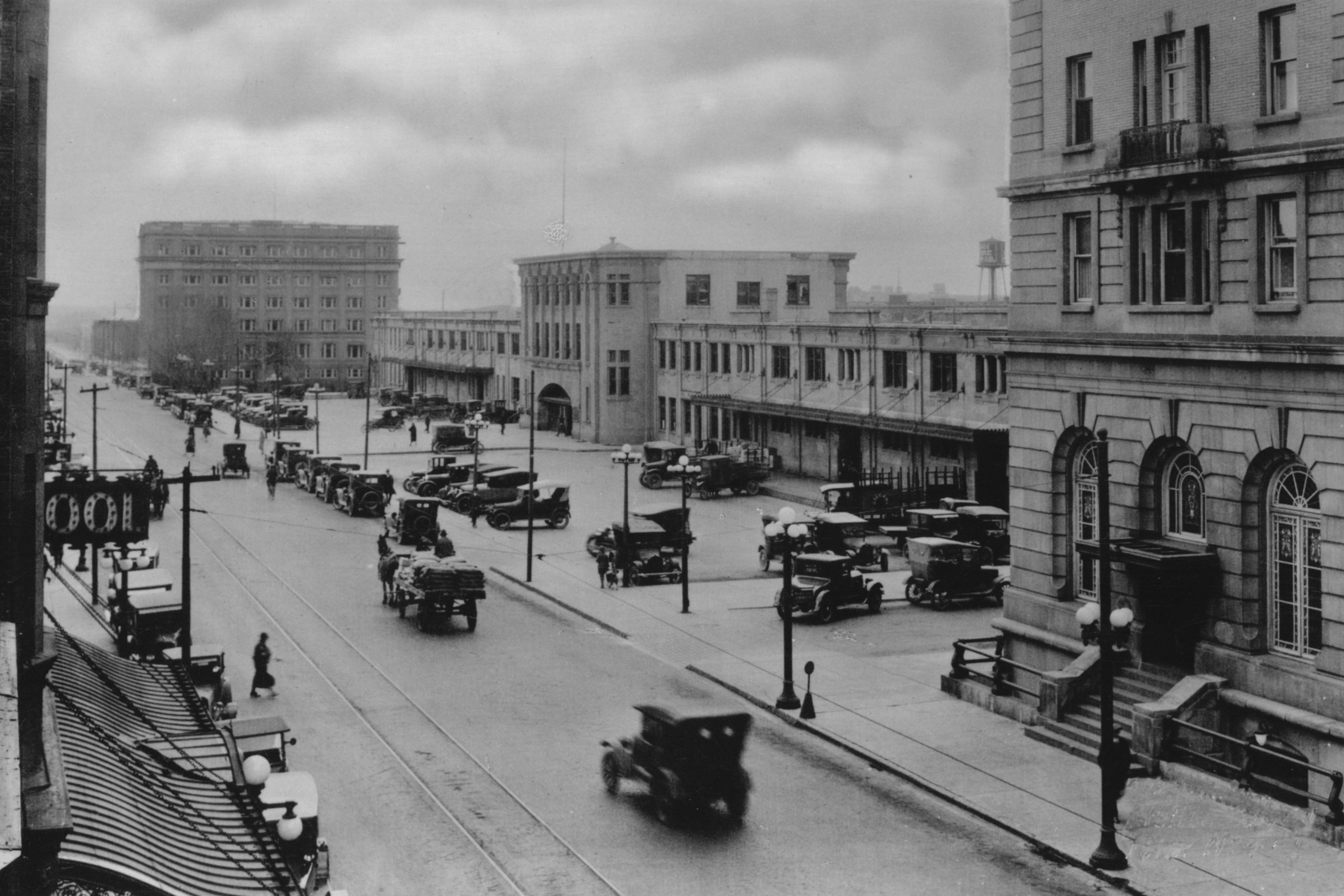

General information
- Owner: Canadian Pacific Railway
- Platforms: 1

Construction
- Architect: Walter S. Painter

History
- Opened: 1908
- Closed: 1965
Location

Calgary station was a railway station in Calgary, Alberta of the Canadian Pacific Railway that operated from 1908 to 1965. The station was designed by the railway's chief architect, Walter Scott Painter, though his design was only executed partially. The center block of the station was completed and operational by the fall of 1908. In an interview in Calgary in October of that year, railway president Thomas Shaughnessy indicated that work on the wings would likely begin in the spring of 1909. In 1965, the station closed, and in 1969 it was demolished to make way for the Calgary Tower. A new station, called Tower Centre, was incorporated into the Tower.

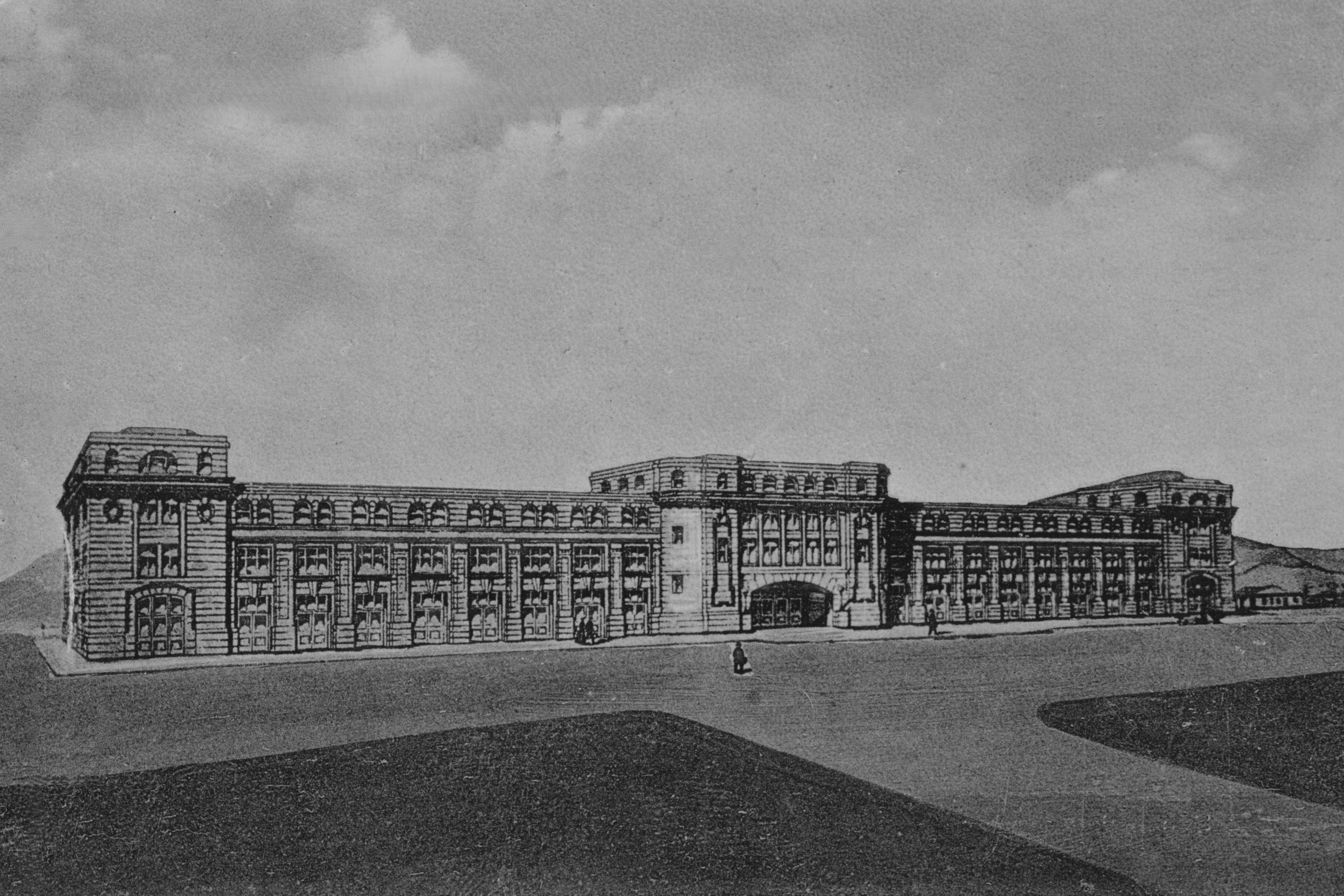
The original design by W. S. Painter, seen above, was executed only partially.
