= Canadian National Hotels =

Hotel chain in Canada

Canadian National Hotels was a hotel chain under control by Canadian National Railways. In addition to their own hotels, it acquired some from predecessor railway companies like the Grand Trunk Pacific Railway, Grand Trunk Railway and Ottawa, Arnprior and Parry Sound Railway. Some of their assets were later acquired by rival Canadian Pacific Hotels after 1988.

== Surviving hotels ==
=== Fairmont Hotels and Resorts ===
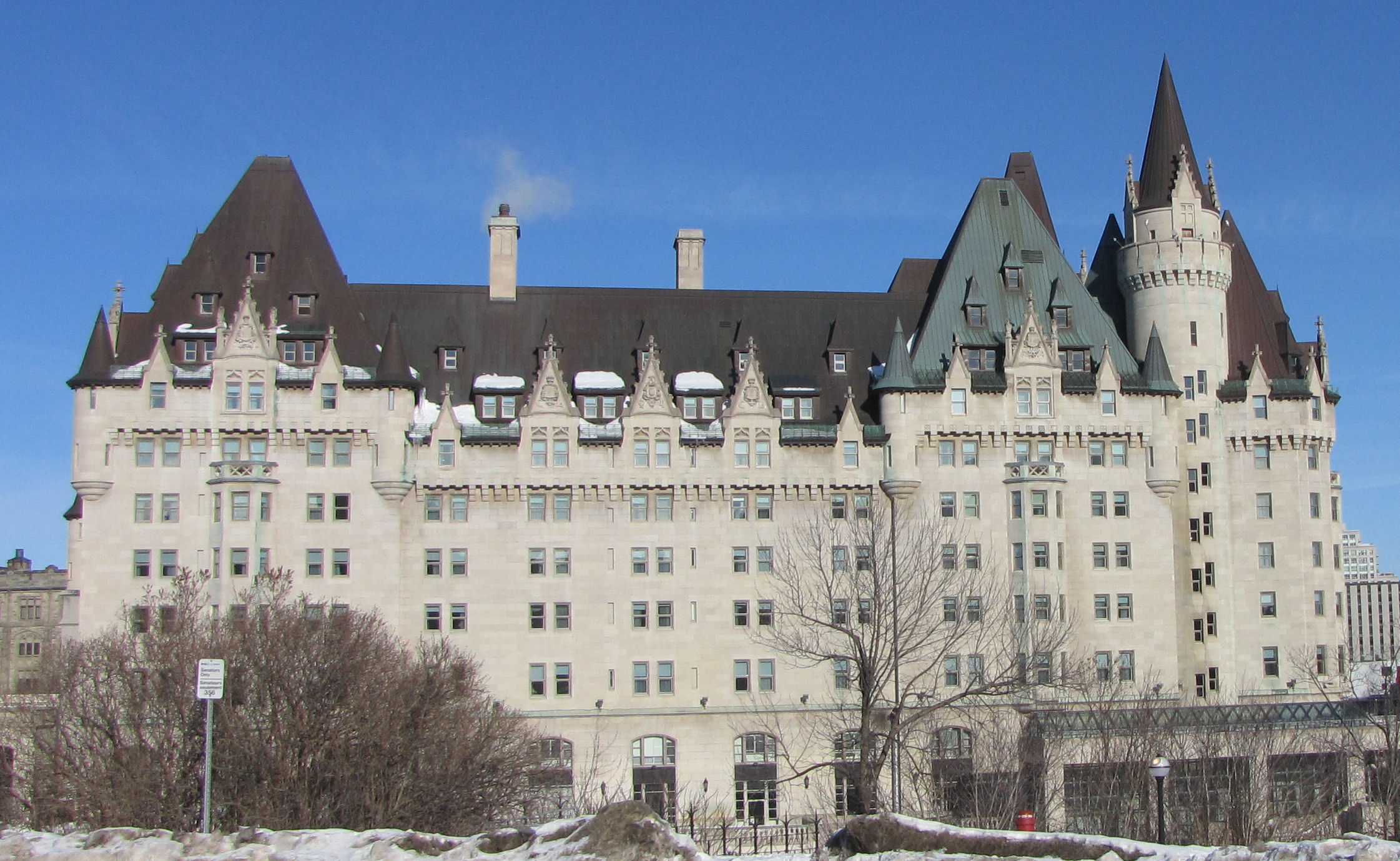
Château Laurier, Ottawa, Ontario

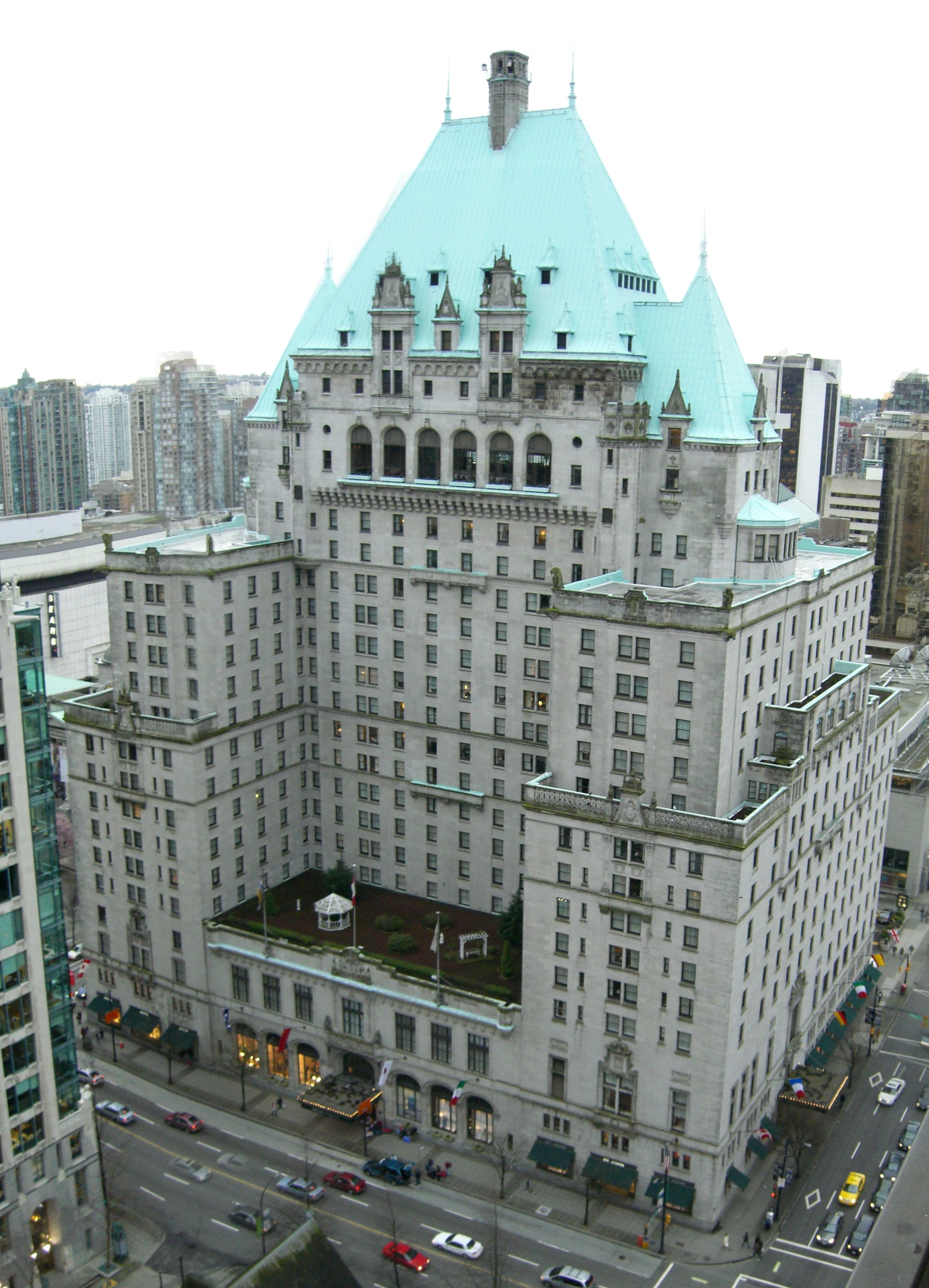
Hotel Vancouver, Vancouver, British Columbia

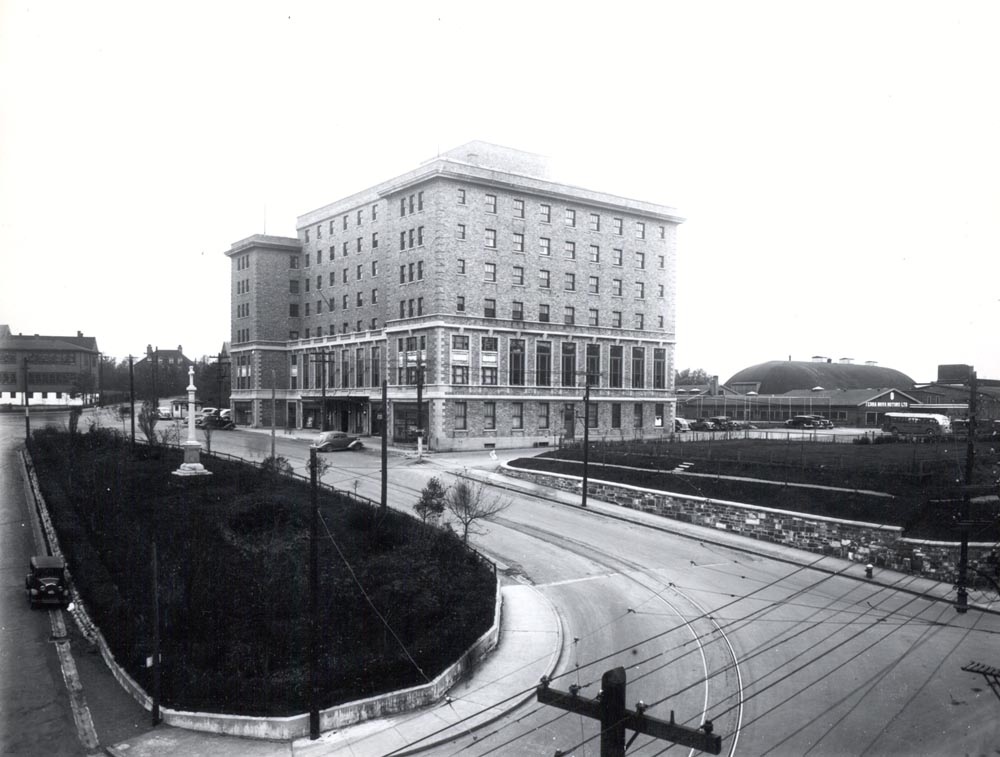
Newfoundland Hotel, St. John's, Newfoundland and Labrador

- Château Laurier Ottawa, Ontario, 1923–1988 – Built for Grand Trunk Railway and now part of the Fairmont chain as Fairmont Château Laurier
- Jasper Park Lodge Jasper, Alberta, 1923–1988 – Built for Canadian National Railway and now part of the Fairmont chain as Fairmont Jasper Park Lodge
- The Macdonald Edmonton, Alberta, 1923–1988 – Built for Grand Trunk Pacific Railway and now part of the Fairmont chain as Fairmont Hotel Macdonald
- Hotel Vancouver Vancouver, British Columbia, 1939–1988 – jointly operated with CP Hotels 1939–1962. Now part of Fairmont chain as Fairmont Hotel Vancouver
- Queen Elizabeth Hotel Montreal, Quebec, 1958–1988 – now part of Fairmont chain as Fairmont The Queen Elizabeth with building owned by Ivanhoé Cambridge.

=== Delta Hotels ===
- The Bessborough Saskatoon, Saskatchewan 1928–1972 – now owned by Delta Hotels as Delta Bessborough
- Hotel Beauséjour Moncton, New Brunswick 1972–1988 – now owned by Delta Hotels as Delta Beauséjour with building owned by Legacy Hotels Real Estate Investment Trust

=== Others ===
- Newfoundland Hotel St. John's, Newfoundland and Labrador 1949–1982. (Old hotel was replaced by a new one that CN operated from 1982 to 1988. Sold to Canadian Pacific Hotels in 1988.) and later operated as Fairmont Newfoundland; now part of Sheraton Hotels chain as Sheraton Hotel Newfoundland
- The Nova Scotian, Halifax, Nova Scotia, 1928-1988? - now, The Westin Nova Scotian, operated by New Castle Hotels since 1996.
- The Charlottetown Charlottetown, Prince Edward Island, 1931-1980s - now owned by Rodd Hotels and Resorts and operated as Rodd Charlottetown
- Pictou Lodge Pictou, Nova Scotia, - originally built as Wentworth Lodge by The Bungalow Camps Company and auction to CNR in 1926; sold 1957 and operated as independent Pictou Lodge Resorts. Closed in 2023. Reopened under new management July 2025
- The Fort Garry Winnipeg, Manitoba, 1923-1979 - Built for Grand Trunk Pacific Railway and now operated as an independent hotel
- Prince Arthur Hotel Port Arthur, Ontario, 1911-1988 - now independent hotel and resort
- L'Hotel, Toronto, Ontario, 1984–1988; later as Crowne Plaza Hotel and now as InterContinental Toronto Centre

== Demolished hotels ==
- Highland Inn, Algonquin Provincial Park, 1923–1932 – built for the Ottawa, Arnprior and Parry Sound Railway and later owned by CN Rail (1923–1931) and last owned by the Government of Ontario; dismantled and burned in 1957; area was reforested with red pine
- Grand Beach Hotel, Grand Beach, Manitoba, built by the Canadian Northern Railway, opened in 1916. Operated by a lessee in later years of Canadian National ownership until 1961; the hotel was gone sometime after 1961, and the area is now known as Grand Beach Provincial Park. The site is now a wooded area of Point Grand Marais.
- Minaki Lodge, Minaki, Ontario, 1923–1950s – built for the Grand Trunk Pacific Railway and later sold to the Government of Ontario; the main lodge burned down in 2003 and the site is now subject to future redevelopment
- Prince Edward Hotel, Brandon, Manitoba, 1916–1949 – demolished; later used for parking and now the site of Kristopher Campbell Memorial Skateboard Plaza

== See also ==
- Canada's grand railway hotels
- Canadian Pacific Hotels 1886-2001
- Grand Trunk Railway Hotels 1912-1923
- Fairmont Hotels and Resorts 2001–present
