= Banff Springs Hotel =

Hotel in Banff, Alberta, Canada

Fairmont Banff Springs
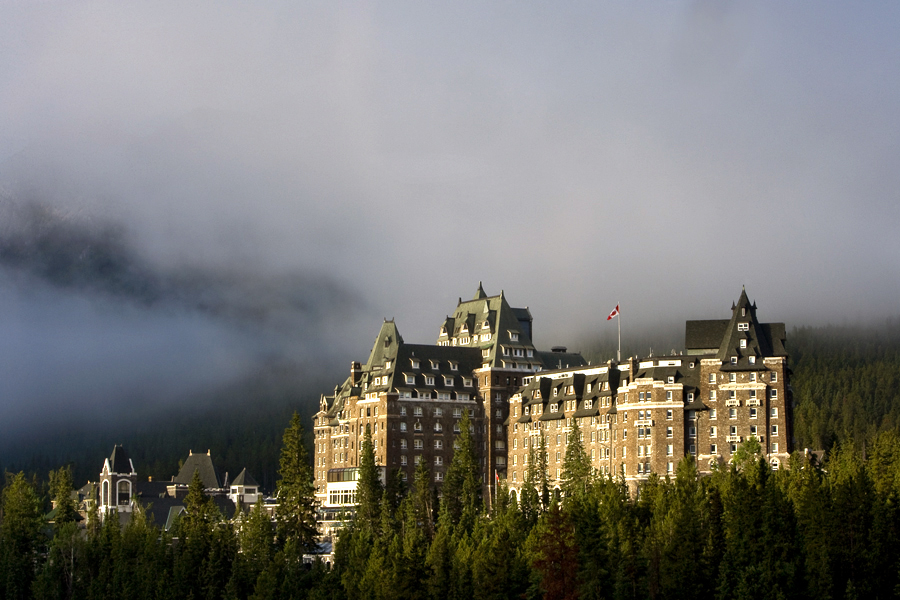
- View of the Banff Springs Hotel
- Interactive map of the Fairmont Banff Springs area
- Former names: Banff Springs Hotel

General information
- Architectural style: Châteauesque
- Location: Banff, Alberta, Canada, 405 Spray Avenue
- Coordinates: 51°09′52″N 115°33′43″W
- Elevation: 1,414 metres (4,639 ft)
- Construction started: 1886 (original building); 1911 (tower); 1927 (main block)
- Opened: 1888
- Owner: Oxford Properties
- Operator: Fairmont Hotels and Resorts

Height
- Height: 59.5 m (195 ft)

Technical details
- Floor count: 15
- Lifts/elevators: 23

Design and construction
- Architects: Bruce Price (original); Walter Painter (tower); John Orrock (main block)

Other information
- Number of rooms: 764
- Number of restaurants: 12

Website
- www.banff-springs-hotel.com

National Historic Site of Canada
- Official name: Banff Springs Hotel National Historic Site of Canada
- Designated: 24 June 1988

The Fairmont Banff Springs, formerly and commonly known as the Banff Springs Hotel, is a historic hotel in western Canada, located in Banff, Alberta. The entire town, including the hotel, is situated in Banff National Park, a national park managed by Parks Canada. At an elevation of 1,414 metres (4,640 ft) above sea level, the hotel overlooks a valley towards Mount Rundle, both of which are situated within the Rocky Mountain mountain range.

Opened in 1888 by the Canadian Pacific Railway, it is one of the earliest of Canada's grand railway hotels. The original five-storey wooden hotel was designed by Bruce Price and was able to accommodate 280 guests. With expansions, the original structure became the North Wing, which was eventually destroyed by fire in April 1926.

The present hotel property is made up of several buildings, of which the main hotel consists of a 1914 eleven-storey center tower designed by Walter S. Painter, and a 1927 North Wing and a 1928 South Wing designed by John Orrock which were built on either side of the Center Tower. On 24 June 1988, the hotel buildings were designated as a National Historic Site of Canada. The hotel property is presently managed by Fairmont Hotels and Resorts.

== Location ==
The Banff Springs Hotel sits at 405 Spray Avenue near the southern boundary of Banff, a resort town within Banff National Park. The hotel property is bounded by roadways and natural waterways. Two roadways bound the hotel to the north, Bow River Avenue, and Rundle River Avenue, while Spray Avenue bounds the hotel from the west. To the east, the hotel property is bounded by the Spray River. The river serves as a tributary for the Bow River, a waterway north of the hotel property. The hotel property sits near the confluence of the two rivers.

The town of Banff is located within the Rocky Mountains mountain range, situated 1,414 metres (4,639 ft) above sea level. The community itself is built around Tunnel Mountain. The hotel property looks over across the valley towards Mount Rundle. Other mountain peaks located near the hotel include Cascade Mountain, Mount Norquay, Stoney Squaw Mountain, and Sulphur Mountain. Given its location within a national park, the hotel is located near a number of attractions and natural landmarks. North of the hotel on the Bow River lies Bow Falls. The Banff Upper Hot Springs is a commercially developed hot spring located south of the hotel.

== Design ==
=== Architecture ===
Banff Springs Hotel is one of Canada's grand railway hotels built by Canadian Pacific Railway. The present hotel property is made up of two main buildings, an eleven-storey tower, and the main block of the hotel. Designed by Walter S. Painter, construction for the tower building, or the centre wing, began in 1911, and was completed in 1914. The main block of the hotel was erected from 1927 to 1928, and replaced the original wooden hotel destroyed in a fire. The original structure was a five-storey wooden building, able to accommodate 280 guests, was designed by Bruce Price. On 24 June 1988, the hotel buildings were designated as a National Historic Site of Canada.

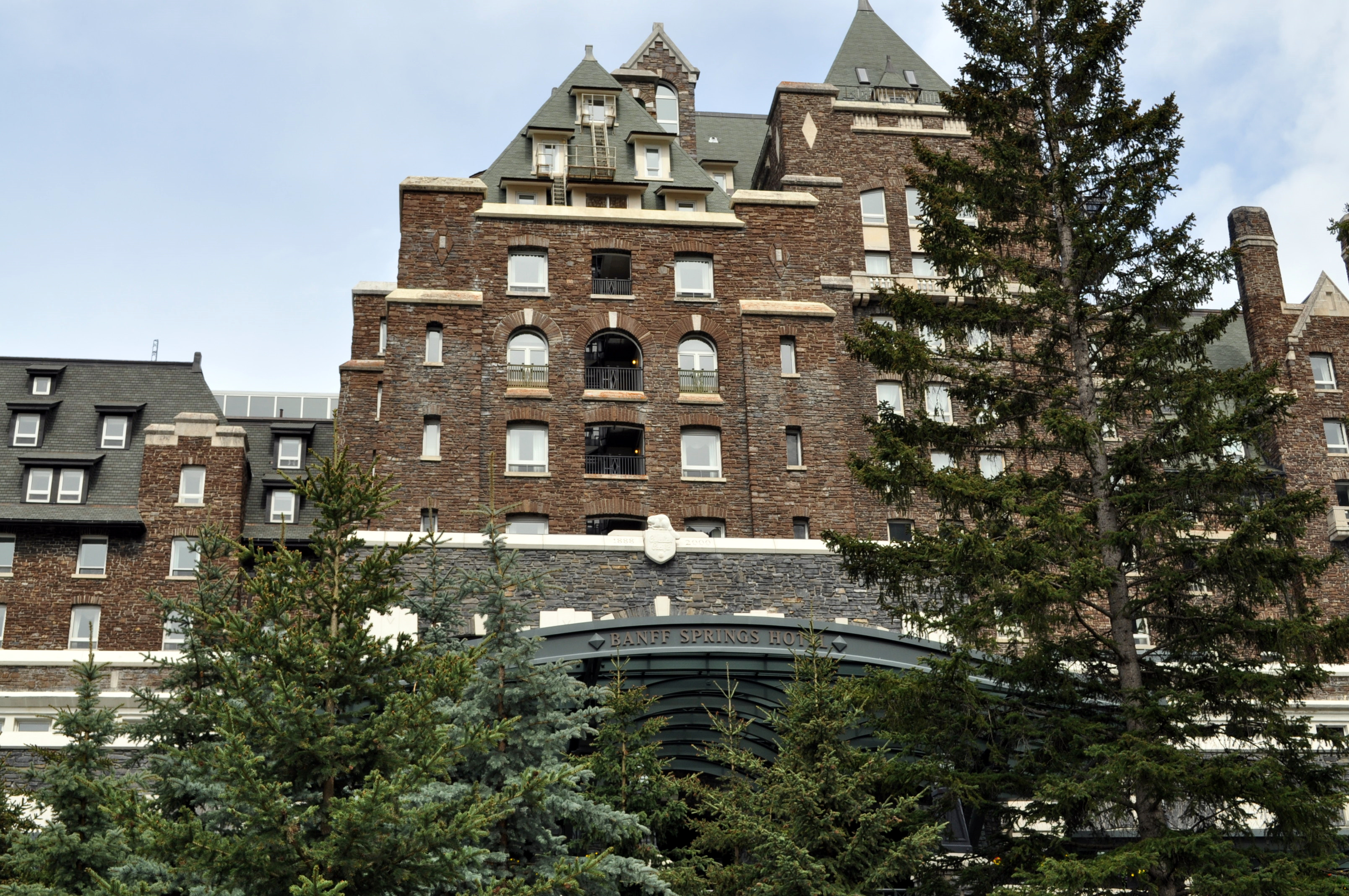
The Canadian Châteauesque design features steep pitched roofs, ornate dormers, and gables.

After the original 1888 wooden structure burnt down in 1926, John W. Orrock, the Chief Engineer for Canadian Pacific Railway, was charged with designing its replacement. The replacement building, or the main block, consisted of the north, and south wing. As with the tower added in 1911, the replacement structure is made up of a steel frame, clad in Rundle limestone. Orrock based elements of the new building with the general styles of the original wooden building designed by Price, meaning that the main block also featured elements found on the chateaus of the Loire Valley in France. As a result, the main block features massive wall surfaces, and steep copper roofs, dormers, and gables.

The original wooden structure, on which the present north and south wing designs are based, featured architectural elements drawn from Scottish baronial architecture, as well as the chateaus of the Loire Valley. This blend of architectural styles would eventually lead to the Châteauesque style used for most of the grand railway hotels in Canada. Châteauesque features found on the building include its steep pitched roofs, pointed dormers, and corner turrets. However, contrasting later Châteauesque hotels built in Canada, Banff Springs Hotel's also draws elements from the Arts and Crafts movement. Elements from this movement include rounded gables, and rough stone masonry used throughout the building. The remains of the burnt building were removed in 1926, in order to make way for the north and south wings.

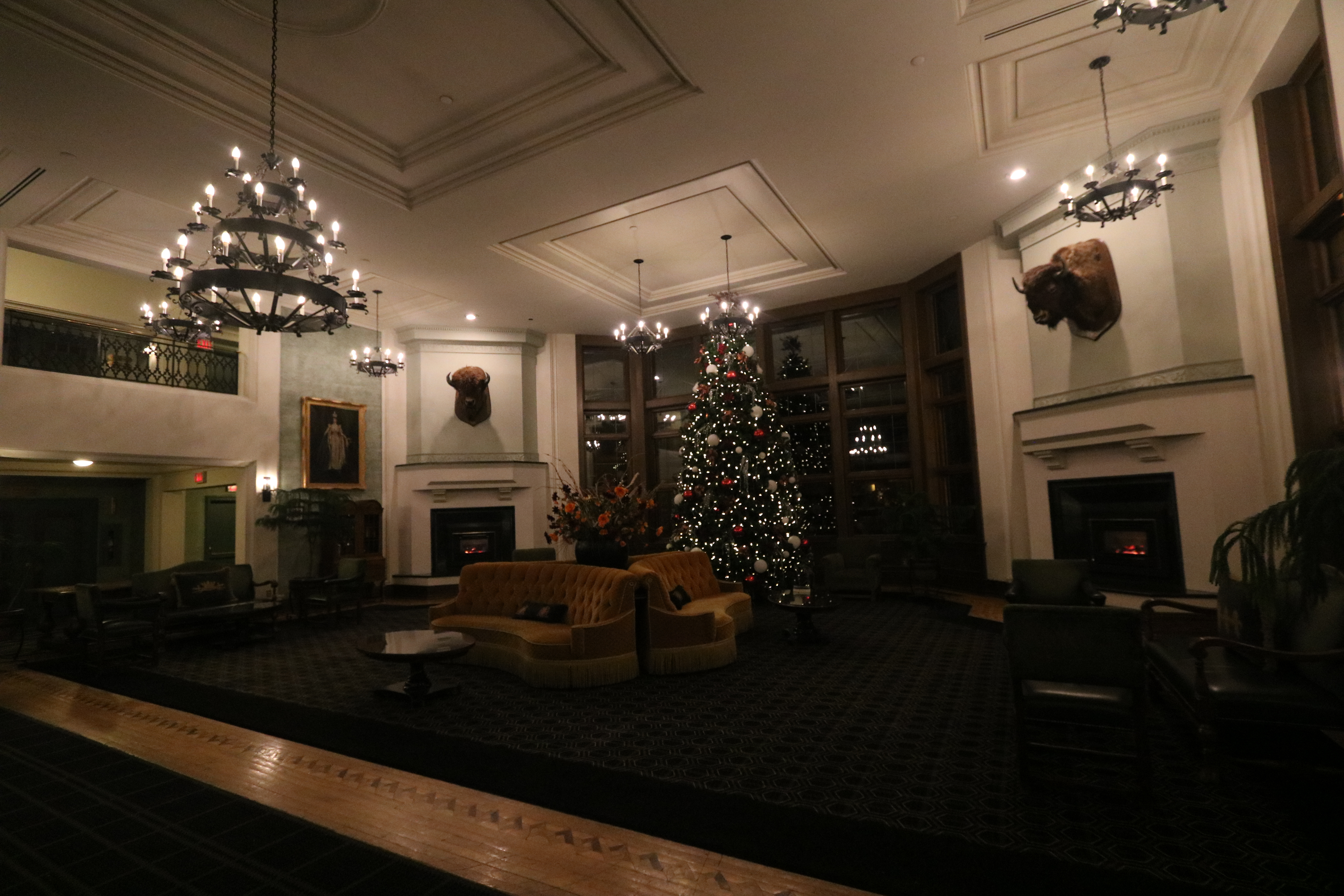
The interior of the hotel features plasterwork on the ceilings and terrazzo floors.

The centre wing tower was a large limestone structure, influenced largely by Scottish baronial architecture. The building was designed originally as an extension of the original wooden structure. Unlike the other wings of the hotel, the centre tower featured almost no French medieval architectural elements. Painter's designs had windows that were rounded, flat dormers as opposed to pointed ones, and rounded arches rather than pointed arches seen in French Gothic architecture. The central wing also featured a Renaissance Revival styled arcade before its first floor lounge.

The interior of the hotel features oak beams, oak panellings and linenfolds, animal carvings, plasterwork of the ceilings, terrazzo floors, and stained glasswork. Materials found in the interior include fossil-filled carved Tyndall limestone from Garson, Manitoba, and Bedford lime flagstones on the floors of Mount Stephen Hall, an event room within the hotel.

=== Facilities ===
The Banff Springs Hotel includes 757 guest rooms and suites spread throughout the hotel property. The hotel property also houses a number of event spaces, used for conferences, weddings, and other social events. Event spaces within the hotel building include the Alberta Dining Room, the Alhambra Dining Room, the Cascade Ballroom, Mount Stephen Hall, and the Riverview Walk. Given its location, the hotel property also features outdoor event spaces, including a terrace garden.

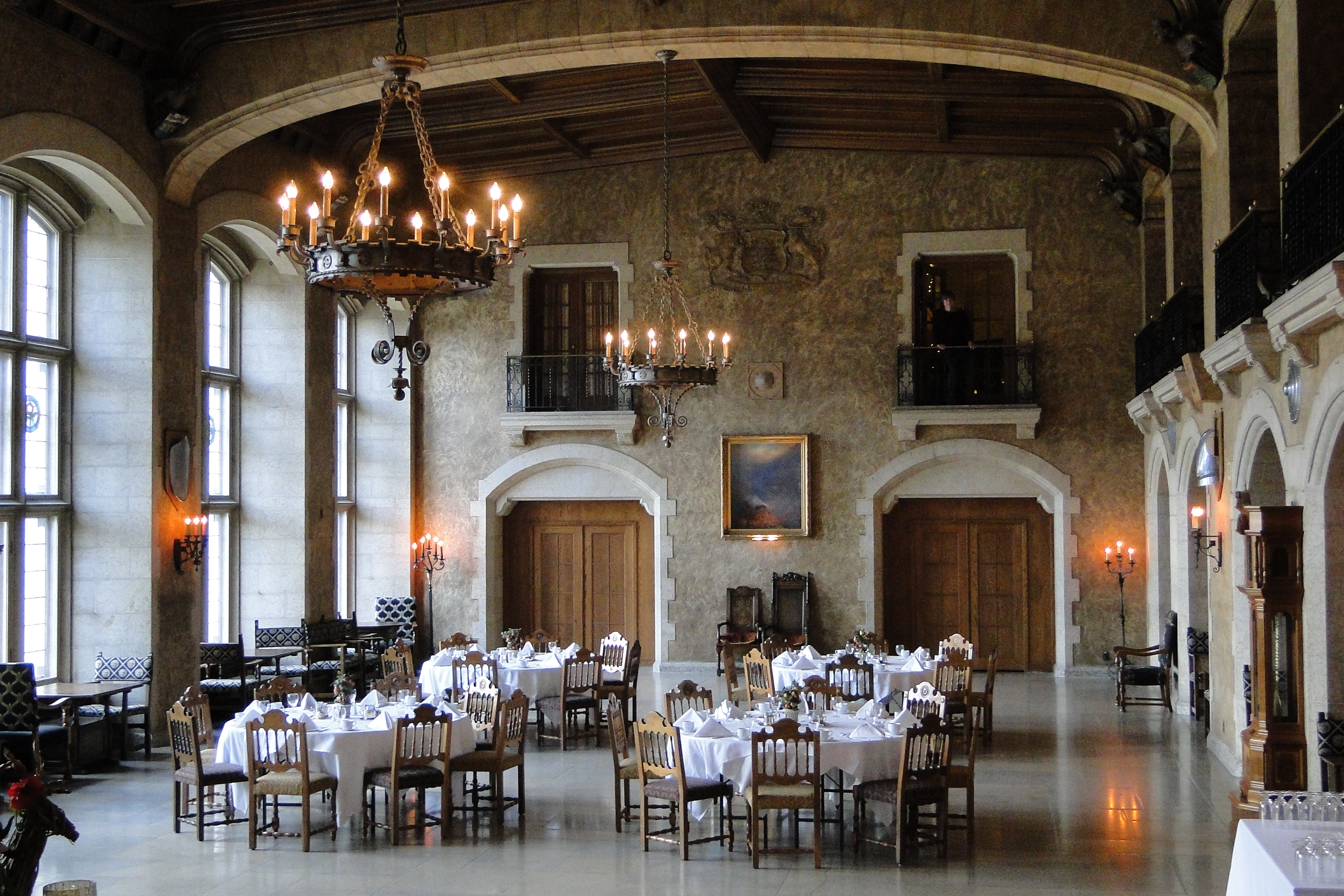
Mount Stephen Hall is used by the hotel as an event space.

A number of areas within the hotel property are also occupied by restaurants, or other food-based services. As of December 2017, twelve restaurants operate within the hotel property. Restaurants located within the hotel include 1888 Chop House, the Waldhaus, and the Rundle Bar, "Castello". The latter restaurant also hosts the hotel's afternoon tea. The hotel also hosts a locally sourced market, Stock Food & Drinks. Other facilities located on the hotel property include a bowling alley, five turf-topped tennis courts, a swimming pool, and a 27-hole golf course designed by golf course architect Stanley Thompson. Spa facilities were opened at the hotel in 1991.

== History ==
The original building was shaped as an H and included an octagonal centre hall, with an additional wing extending from its towards the Bow River. The building was clad in shingles with stone accents. Tiered verandahs were situated at the end each wing. The 1888 structure cost $250,000 and a mistake made by the builder changed the intended orientation of the building, turning its back on the mountain vista. This building included more than 100 bedrooms, centered on a five-story, octagonal rotunda. The hotel was named for the natural hot springs emanating from various places on Sulphur Mountain which was also piped into the hotel.

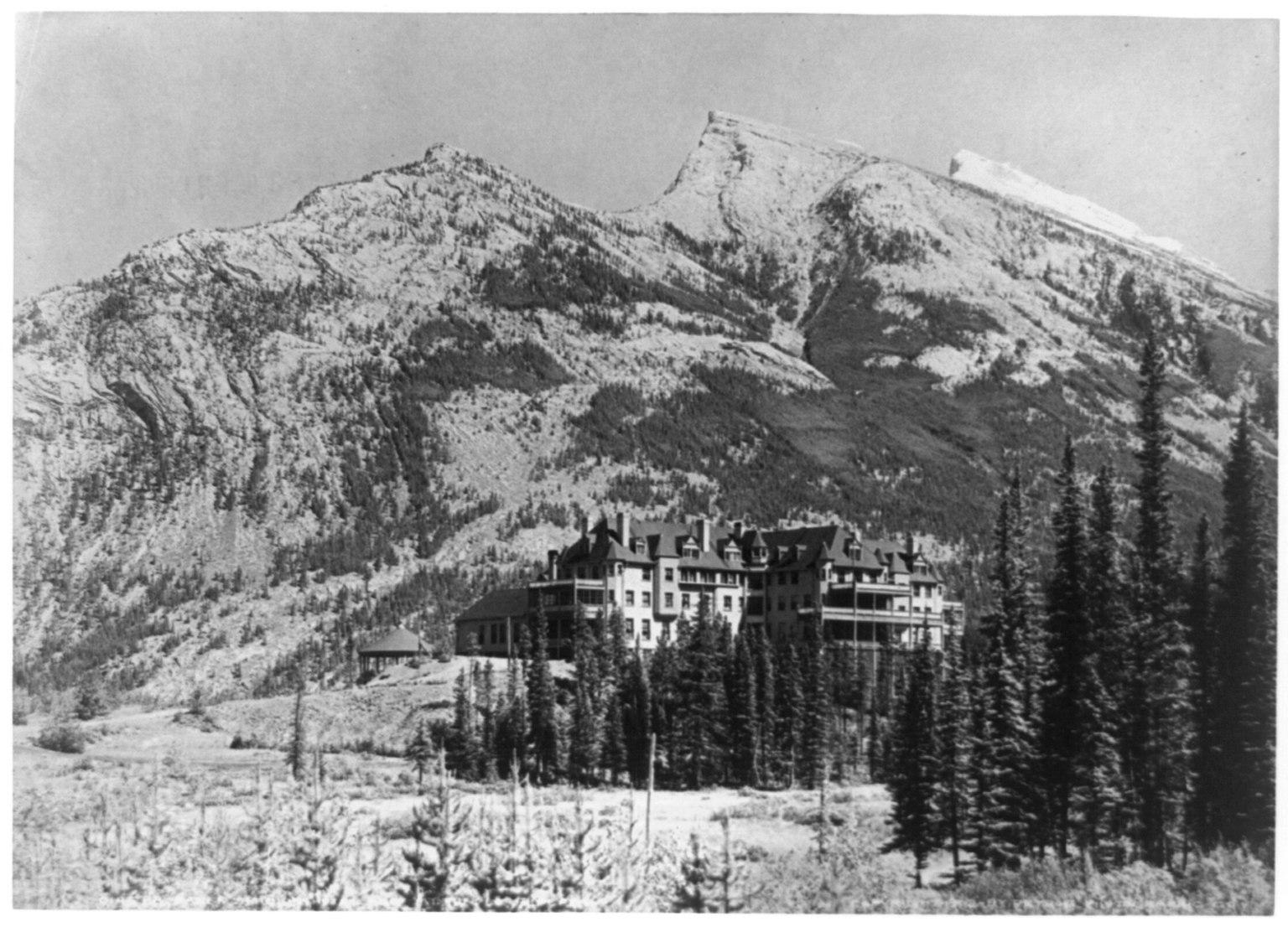
The hotel in 1902

An addition in 1902 expanded and renovated the building, adding more than 200 rooms. By 1906, plans were advanced for a complete overhaul of the Banff Springs Hotel building, proposing a replacement of much of the original structure. Walter Painter, chief architect for Canadian Pacific Railway, designed an eleven-story central tower in concrete and stone, flanked by two wings. This time correctly oriented to the dramatic view, the so-called "Painter Tower" was completed in 1914 at the cost of $2 million with 300 guest arooms and, for some time, became the tallest building in Canada. Construction of new wings was delayed by World War I, and the surviving Price wings continued in service.

Further renovations designed by architect, J. W. Orrock, who continued in style originated by Painter, significantly expanding the Painter Tower, altering its roofline, and adding two substantial wings following a fire in 1926 which destroyed the original building designed by Price. The two new wings completed and opened in 1928.

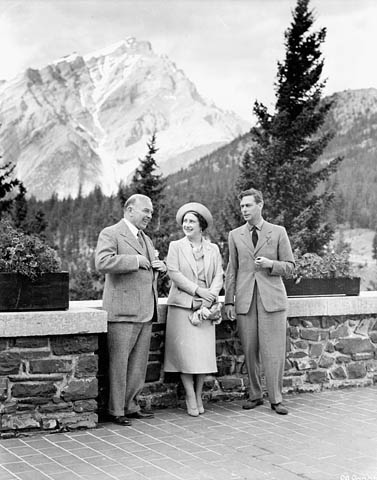
King George VI (right), and Queen Elizabeth (centre) at Banff Springs Hotel during their 1939 royal tour.

The Monarch of Canada, King George VI, and Queen Elizabeth visited the hotel during their 1939 royal tour of Canada. From 1942 to 1945, the hotel was shut down in an effort to free up labour for the war effort.

In 1968, the building underwent a process of winterization, allowing for the hotel to operate year-round. The hotel went through several renovations during the latter half of the 20th century, including one in 1971, and another in preparation for the 1988 Winter Olympics.

In 2001, Canadian Pacific Hotels, the hotel division of Canadian Pacific Railway, was reorganized as Fairmont Hotels and Resorts, adopting the name from an American company it had purchased in 1999. The hotel's name was changed to the Fairmont Banff Springs as a part of this re-branding effort. In 2006, seven Fairmont hotels, including Banff Springs, sold to Oxford Properties, a company owned by the Ontario Municipal Employees Retirement System. Fairmont Hotels and Resorts continues to manage the resort following the sale of the hotel property.

== See also ==
- List of Canadian railway hotels
- List of hotels in Canada
