= The Listel Hotel =

Coordinates: 49.28706°N 123.12932°W

- Website: www.thelistelhotel.com

The Listel Hotel is a hotel located in the downtown area of the Canadian city of Vancouver, British Columbia

== Description and operations ==
The hotel has 129 rooms and displays art on loan from the University of British Columbia's Museum of Anthropology, the Buschlen Mowatt Fine Arts Gallery and the Vancouver International Sculpture Biennale. It has also a collection of international and First Nations art.

The hotel was an inaugural participant in the City of Vancouver's "Corporate Climate Leader" and Tourism Vancouver's "Tourism Ambassador for Conservation" programs. It has 20 solar panels, a heat-capture program, and has been zero-waste-to-landfill since 2011.

The hotel’s restaurant, Forage, is an active member of the Green Table Network and the Vancouver Aquarium's Ocean Wise seafood program. Its small-plate menu is locally sourced. The Jervis Joint, a second restaurant located within the hotel, serves pub food.

== Awards ==
Expedia listed the hotel in eighth place on its 2019 list of the ten most sustainable hotels.
