= Auberge Le Saint-Gabriel =

Oldest restaurant in Montreal

Coordinates: 45.51°N 73.55°W

Auberge Le Saint-Gabriel (Auberge Saint-Gabriel) is located in Old Montreal, Canada, and was the first establishment to have an alcohol license issued in 1754 as stated by Lesley Chesterman from the Gazette Montreal “...granted the first liquor licence under British rule"(Lesley Chesterman). Established in 1754 this historic landmark still stands to this day as a tourist destination updated with a refined French cuisine restaurant. To add on, it is also allegedly haunted by the ghost of a 19th-century girl who died in a building fire.

== History ==
The origin of Auberge Le Saint-Gabriel dates back to from the late 17th century to the mid 18th century. As stated by Lesley Chesterman "The inn changed hands - and names - several times…”(Lesley Chesterman). Also stated by an article from The Gazette "Built as a two-storey house in 1688 by French soldier Étienne Truteau, the edifice was converted in 1754 into North America's first inn 15 years later, and was granted the first liquor licence under British rule "(Lesley Chesterman). Since it was not established as an inn during his lifetime, Étienne Truteau lived in his homemade house until he died in 1712.

Following his death the next owner Richard Dulong would become the one to refine the house into a fully established inn on 4 March 1754. From then on the inn became a popular place for travelers to rest on long journeys.

However, as time went on the inn's popularity began to decline due to more inn's being established throughout the country. The building was turned back into a townhouse in the 19th century, but returned to its original vocation in 1914 thanks to Ludger Truteau who renamed it Auberge Saint-Gabriel. To add on, Auberge Saint-Gabriel was then purchased by the Bolay family in 1987 who continued to use it as an inn for travelers.

Today the establishment is currently co-owned by Marc Bolay, Garou and Guy Laliberté who as stated by Lesley Chesterman "The interior decor features thick stone walls surrounding round and square tables that are set on wooden plank floors below wrought-iron chandeliers"., showing how the new owners further renovated the inn, added the French cuisine themed restaurant, and renamed it Auberge Le Saint-Gabriel(Lesley Chesterman).

== Today ==
Co-owned by Mark Bolay, whose family bought the inn in 1987, Garou and Guy Laliberté, the inn/restaurant has seen an increase in tourism based on its claim of being the first of its kind. In order to keep up with the current times, the inn has seen a lot of remodeling that allows it to stay current while also retaining its rustic 19th century aesthetic. As stated by Lesley Chesterman "Here’s a restaurant that straddles both tradition and modernity", showing that the owners stand to pay homage to what it was before, while maintaining current atmosphere that is expected today(Lesley Chesterman). Lesley goes on to praise the restaurant by saying "There are restaurants that offer a summer ambience, with a large terrasse or a row of towering windows. And there are those that offer a winter ambience, with fireplaces, cosy banquettes and intimate corners. L'Auberge Saint-Gabriel has always seemed like the latter, thanks to its historic stone building…”(Lesley Chesterman).

To add on the restaurant is also home to several banquet rooms for private functions, a club in the basement, and valet parking. In addition, the restaurant built next door is home to an array of French-Canadian delicacies. Lesley Chesterman goes on to say “ Main courses are just as delicious. With a spring chill still in the air, the braised lamb shank served with white coco beans and rosemary-infused braising juices is not to be missed. The meat is somehow falling-off-the-bone tender yet not in the least bit mushy - a real coup for a kitchen forced to churn out many different dishes for a hundred-plus diners a day."(Lesley Chesterman). In addition Lesley also says "I'd also recommend the lobster galette, a hockey-puck-shaped patty served in a pool of thick lobster bisque. Flavoured with Cognac and tarragon and lightly breaded, this appetizer managed to be both hearty and elegant. I won't deny something more than the accompanying mound of lamb's lettuce might have brightened up the rich flavours (how about a salsa or relish?), yet the dish is still a winner."(Lesley Chesterman). Since it is a high class restaurant, Auberge is home to elegant and expensive food. Lesley goes on to state "Price range: Starters, $6-$23; main courses, $23-$47; desserts, $6-$9. Three-course table d'hôte: $32-$44, Lunch-time table d'hôte: $18-$22".(Lesley Chesterman). Auberge's elegancy in fine dining is also matched by their drinks, as the wines offered range from forty six dollars to seventy dollars.

== The 19th Century Ghost ==
Over the decades Auberge Le Saint-Gabriel has been heard to hold many stories. The 19th century ghost is the only one to have survive the decades. However, not much information has been told about the ghost. Stated by Matthew Grillo, a reporter from Global news "Some insiders tell us there is a ghost of a little girl that was basically burned out in a fire and she can be heard playing piano from time to time" (Matthew Grillo).

== Sources ==
- Tourism Montreal, Auberge Le Saint-Gabriel (Retrieved 29 October 2008)
- Montreal Gazette, Creepy Montreal, Al Kratina, Sunday, 26 October, page A3
- USA Today, Extra Day in Montreal, 08/01/2003 – Updated 01:15 pm ET (Retrieved 29 October 2008)
- David Sanger Photography, Canada, Montreal, Auberge Saint Gabriel, oldest inn in North America (Retrieved 29 October 2008)
- Montreal Gazette (Retrieved 10 December 2018)
