= InterContinental Toronto Centre =

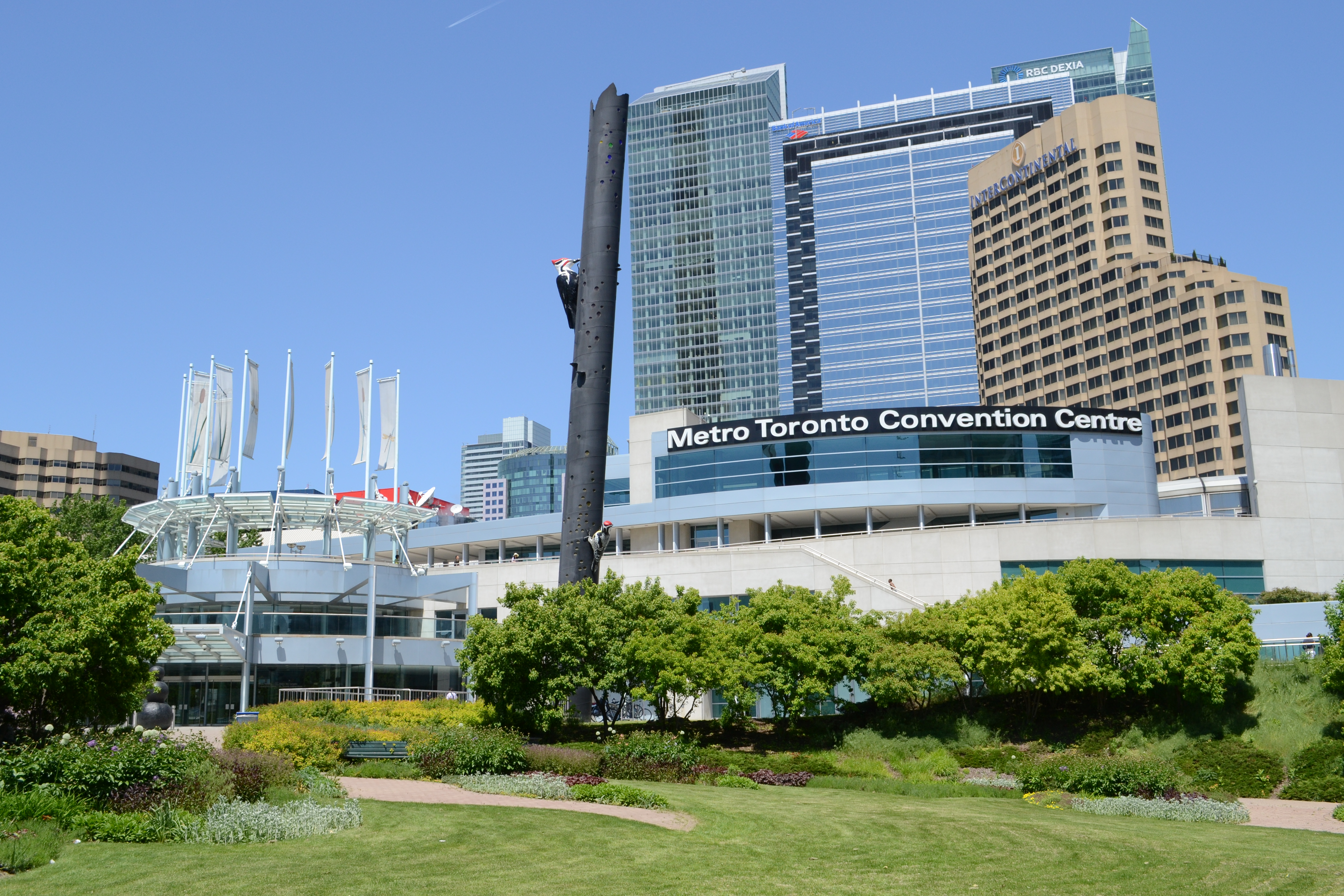
- InterContinental Toronto Centre and the Metro Toronto Convention Centre
- Interactive map of the InterContinental Toronto Centre area

General information
- Location: 225 Front Street West; Toronto, Ontario; M5V 2X3
- Coordinates: 43°38′39″N 79°23′12″W
- Opening: 1984
- Owner: Canadian National Railway 1984-1988, Canada Lands Company 1988-2011, Oxford Properties, 2011–present
- Operator: Canadian National Hotels 1984-1988, Canadian Pacific Hotels 1988-1993, InterContinental Hotels Group 1993-present

Technical details
- Floor count: 25
- Floor area: + 18733 sq ft (meeting rooms and ball room only)

Design and construction
- Architects: Crang and Boake
- Developer: Canadian National Railway and Canada Lands Company

Other information
- Number of rooms: 448
- Number of suites: 138
- Number of restaurants: 1 (Azure)
- Parking: 1200 shared with Metro Toronto Convention Centre North Building

Website
- www.torontocentre.intercontinental.com

The InterContinental Toronto Centre is a hotel located in the downtown core of Toronto, Ontario, Canada. It is part of the Metro Toronto Convention Centre complex on Front Street West in the former Railway Lands. The hotel is managed by InterContinental Hotels.

The hotel was constructed by the Canadian National Railway, and opened in 1984 as L'Hôtel. The modern concrete-clad tower was the last hotel built for Canadian National Hotels, on former CN railway land that was supposed to be part of the Metro Centre development (only the CN Tower was built). It was operated by CN Hotels until 1988, when that chain merged with Canadian Pacific Hotels. The hotel property was transferred from CN to Canada Lands Company and CP Hotels assumed management. InterContinental Hotels Group took over management in 1993 and the hotel was renamed Crowne Plaza Toronto Centre. In September 2003, after the hotel completed a C$21 million renovation, it transferred to IHG's upscale InterContinental brand and was renamed InterContinental Toronto Centre. Canada Lands sold the hotel to Oxford Properties in September 2011 for C$225 million.

The hotel overlooks the tracks from Union Station (Toronto) and the south sections of the Metro Toronto Convention Centre.

== See also ==
- CN Tower - connected by Skywalk
- Rogers Centre - connected by Skywalk
- Fairmont Royal York
- CBC Broadcasting Centre
- Simcoe Place
- CityPlace, Toronto - southwest of the hotel
