= Prince Arthur Hotel =

Hotel in Thunder Bay, Canada

The Prince Arthur Hotel
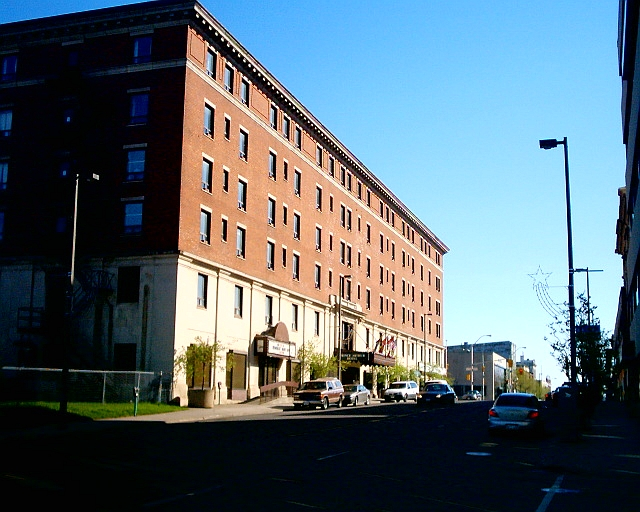
- The Prince Arthur Hotel
- Interactive map of the The Prince Arthur Hotel area

General information
- Location: Thunder Bay, Ontario
- Coordinates: 48.43516°N 89.2187°W
- Opening: March 14, 1911
- Owner: Independent (previously a CN Hotel)

Technical details
- Floor count: 6

Design and construction
- Architect: J.D. Matheson

Other information
- Number of rooms: 121
- Number of restaurants: 1
- Parking: Outdoor

The Prince Arthur Hotel is a historic hotel in Thunder Bay, Ontario, built in 1911 by the Canadian Northern Railway and operated as a CN Hotel until 1955. The hotel was sold and now operates independently.

== History ==
In 1908, while travelling to Winnipeg, John James Carrick, Sir William Mackenzie and Sir Donald Mann were playing poker in a private car. In the wee morning hours, Carrick told the other two men that Port Arthur needed a good hotel and the Canadian Northern Railway should build one and even had a perfect location for it (the existing one). In a plebiscite taken at the end of April 1909, the citizens of Port Arthur endorsed the transfer of city land to the C.N.R. on which to build a grand new hotel.

In 1910, construction began with Toronto firm Imperial Construction acting as general contractors. They delegated the work to local tradesmen and sourced materials locally: the cut stone supplied by Stanworth-Martin Company of Port Arthur and brick from the furnaces of the Twin City Sand Company. The six-storey hotel was made almost entirely of concrete and marble including walls, ceilings and floors, with very little wood, to ensure it was fireproof. Commissioned artwork was hung throughout the hotel, as well as commissioned murals were painted in the rotunda depicting the building of the CNR into the city. In total, it cost $850,000 to build the hotel, a value of $14.5 million in 2018!

The choice Prince Arthur for the name of the hotel was fortuitous for, when on January 14, 1911, it was announced that Prince Arthur, Duke of Connaught, would become Canada's next Governor General. The newly-minted Governor General visited Port Arthur in August 1912. With permission, his family crest, a British lion above a ducal coronet, was incorporated with the C.N.R. monogram and used on the hotel's chairs and dishes.

On March 14, 1911, the brand-new Prince Arthur Hotel had its grand opening dinner event where over 100 selected guests sat down to a superb 18-course meal of classical French cuisine. The menu itself was extravagant, even by today's standards. Appetizers were caviar canapé à la Russe, blue points on shell, essence of tomatoes en tasse, stuffed celery, radishes and olives, and sherry. Main courses were tournedos of beef tenderloin with béarnaise sauce, medallions of halibut with sauce Valois, pommes dauphine, pomme pailles, haricots, flageolets, claret, supreme of chicken with fresh mushrooms, punch Benedictine, new potatoes in cream, champagne, salad Prince Arthur, cheese soufflé, demi-tasse, and cognac.

The Prince Arthur offered first-class accommodation, charging $1.50 to $2.00 a day for a regular room and $2.00 to $3.00 if you wanted a bath. The floors in the bathing rooms were made from the same marble as the rotunda. Each bedroom was twenty feet long and faced outside. The first three floors were furnished in mahogany, and the upper floors in weathered oak.

Many guests arrived by rail and steamship and entered the hotel through the hotel’s famed formal gardens, which were designed by landscape artist H.F. Boyce of North Battleford, Saskatchewan. The gardens gave way to a parking lot in 1958.

== Other information ==
Remnants of two tunnels are in the hotel’s basement. One tunnel lead to the lake shore while the other tunnel used to connect to a neighbouring hotel, the Marriaggi Hotel, which is now the silver government building across the street.

In 1921, the poppy was first adopted as the symbol of remembrance at a meeting at the hotel and in 1991, a commemorative plaque was hung in the hotel’s lobby.

== Famous guests and visitors ==
In 1914, Mrs. MacLean, a student of the famous Russian ballet dancer Louis Chalif, ran a ballroom dance studio out of the hotel.

Sir Robert Borden, Prime Minister of Canada at the time, and Lady Borden stayed at the hotel on December 31, 1914 where they were received in the drawing room.

Australian contralto Eva Mylott, a protégé of the famous Dame Nellie Melba, stayed at the hotel in the mid to late 1910s. She was the paternal grandmother of actor Mel Gibson and a relative of the Australian concert pianist Tamara Anna Cislowska.

King George VI and Queen Elizabeth visited the Lakehead on May 23, 1939. A dance was held in their honour at the Prince Arthur before they continued heading west by train. The hotel also provided the dinner rolls and pastries that the royal party ate while on-board the royal car.

Travelling musicians performing in town often stayed at the Prince Arthur: Duke Ellington, Harry James, Benny Goodman, Louis Armstrong, and Johnny Cash to name a few.
