= The Gold Range =

Canadian hotel and bar in Yellowknife, Northwest Territories

Coordinates: 62°27′12″N 114°22′15″W

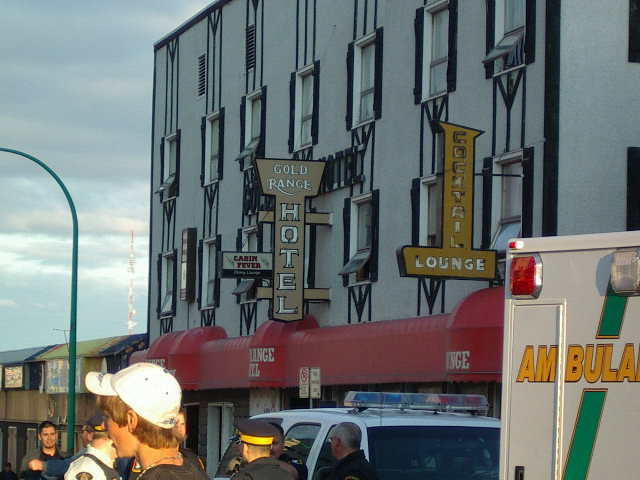
Gold Range Hotel and Lounge

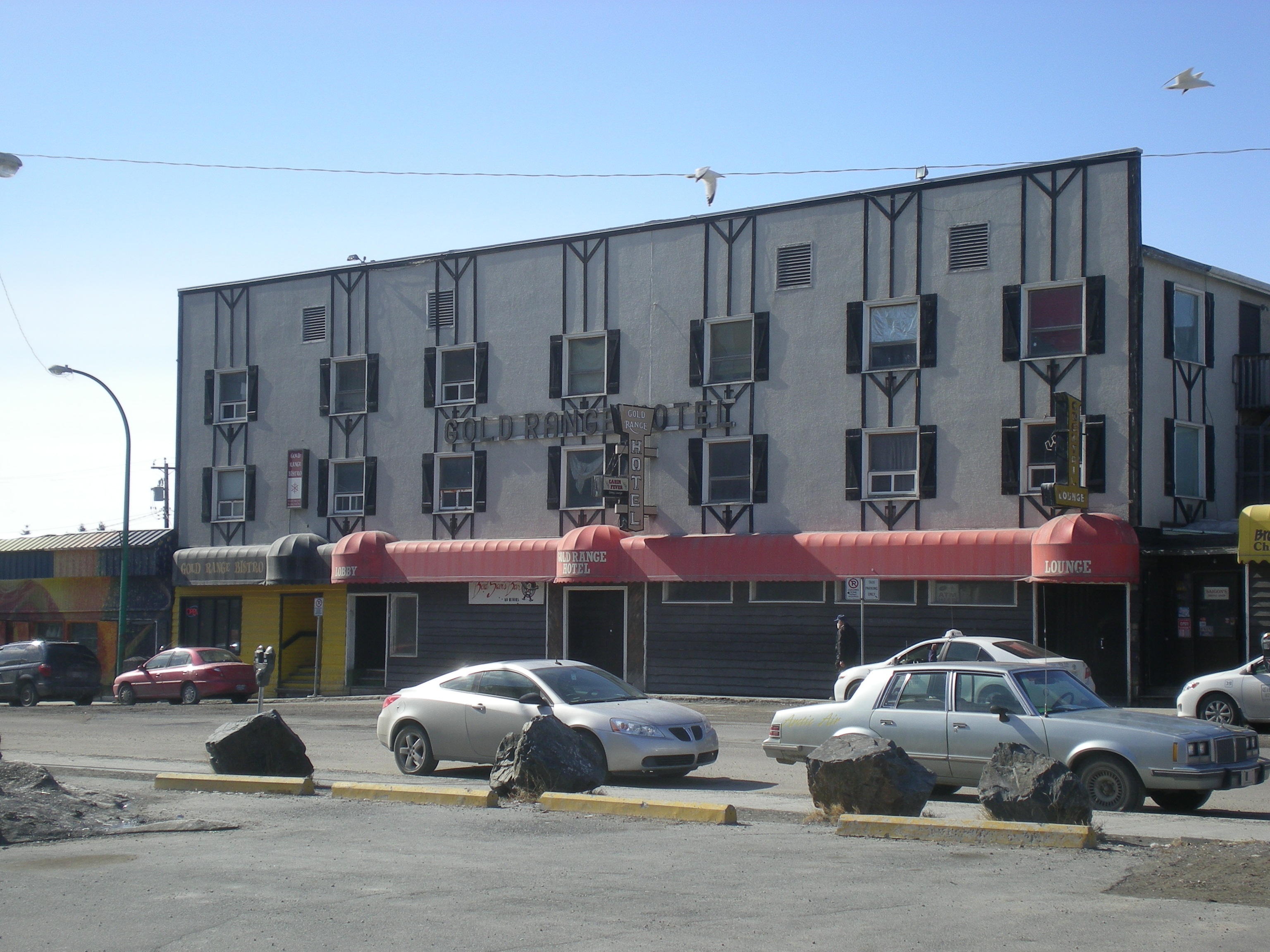
Gold Range Hotel and Lounge from across the street.

The Gold Range is a Canadian hotel and bar located in Yellowknife, Northwest Territories.

The Gold Range, on 50th Street, is a notorious location with a reputation stretching across the Canadian Arctic. It was built on the site of The Cave Restaurant and Central Apartments (formerly The Veterans Restaurant and Rooming House), which was destroyed by fire in 1956. The Gold Range is commonly known as "The Strange Range", having housed a rough and tumble bar, strip joint, boarding house and cafe complex since it was completed during 1957. Grand opening of the 52-room hotel, cafe and cocktail bar was in May 1958.

Jacob Glick was the original owner of the hotel and bar but slowly sold his interest to a variety of business partners in the late 1960s including Rocky Wagner and Harry Pysmenny. Newton Wong was the owner of the Gold Range Cafe, a popular Chinese cuisine destination. The Gold Range was the first bar to serve draught beer in the Northwest Territories in 1972. In 1977, entrepreneur Sam Yurkiw purchased The Gold Range. In 1988, The Gold Range sold more beer than any other bar in Canada, according to its former general manager, Harvey Bourgeois. In 1989, another report states that the bar was the third highest grossing bar nationwide; in 1991, it was reported to be second.

The Gold Range was sold to Edmonton businessman Jay Park in 2007. On April 16, 2009, Sam Yurkiw died at age 83, but the bar and the beer live on. In 2011, the city announced that it was considering purchasing the lot on which the Gold Range is located. News articles began to appear about how this would put the bar at risk of closing.

== Trivia ==
In Mordecai Richler's 1989 novel Solomon Gursky Was Here, the protagonist Moses Berger makes several visits to the Gold Range during his trips to Yellowknife. Aritha Van Herk's novel The Tent Peg also begins in a Yellowknife bar which, while not named, is believed to be the Gold Range. In Kathy Reichs' 2012 novel Bones Are Forever, the Gold Range is mentioned during a trip to Yellowknife.

In 2013, Yellowknifer John Henderson and his daughter built a replica model of the Gold Range Hotel entirely out of lego blocks. The lego model gained international interest on social media.
