= Radisson Toronto East Hotel =

Hotel in Ontario, Canada

Coordinates: 43.7693°N 79.3222°W

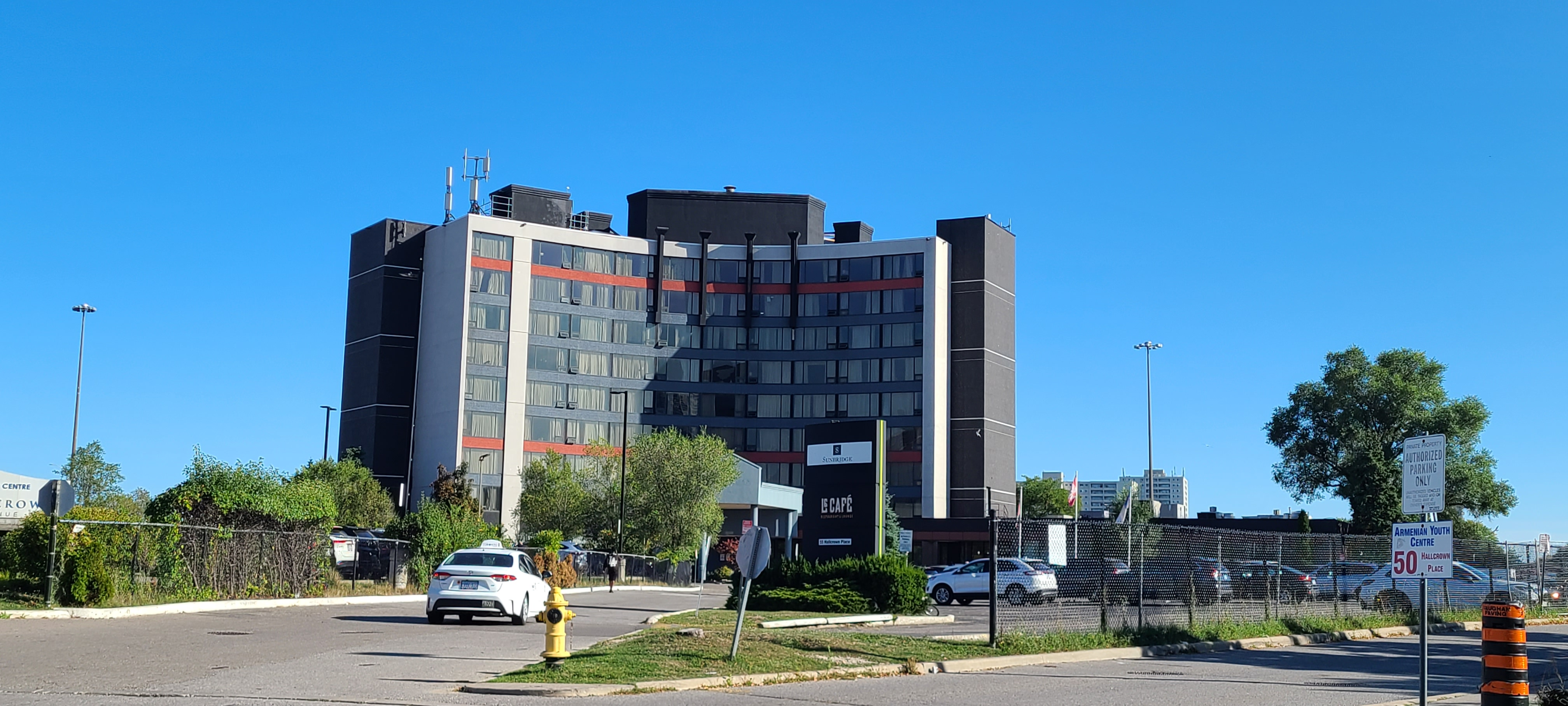
Radisson Toronto East Hotel

Radisson Toronto East Hotel is a hotel in North York, Toronto, Ontario. It is located at 55 Hallcrown Place, immediately north-west of the intersection of Highway 401 and Highway 404.

As of September 2018, there were 400 African refugees staying there long term, causing the media to label it as a refugee camp and refugee hotel. In October 2018, an arsonist started a fire in the hotel, although Toronto Police said there was no indication the fire was an attack on the refugees.
