= Minaki Lodge =

Canadian hotel in Minaki, Ontario

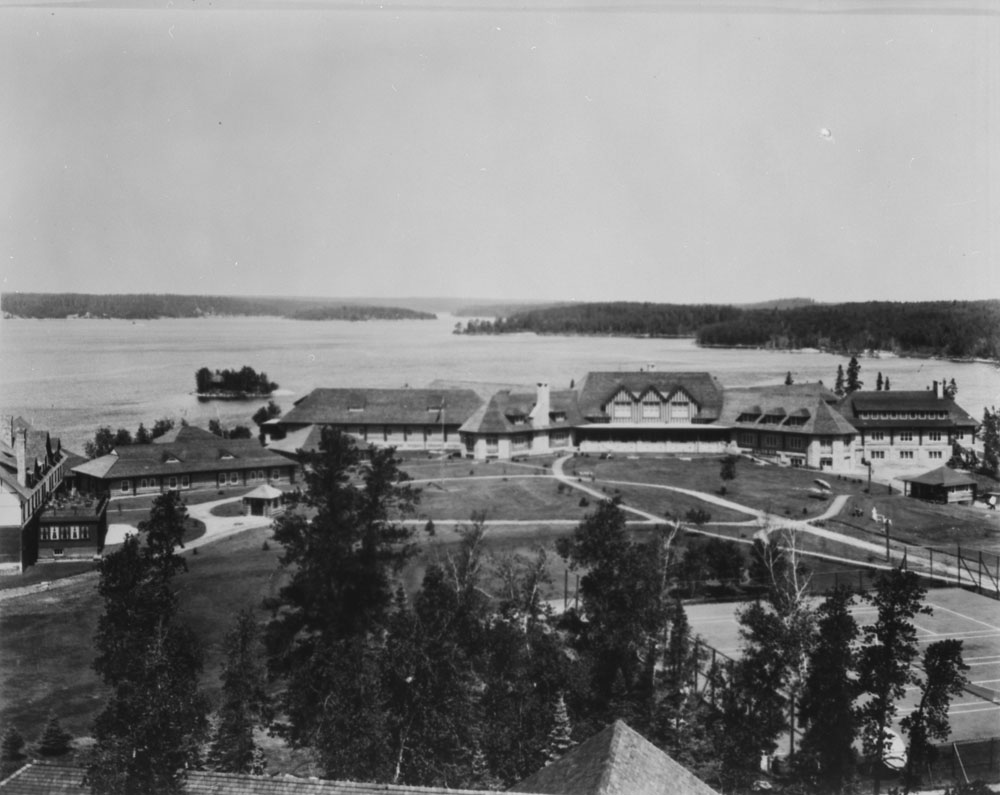
Minaki Lodge in 1929

Minaki Lodge (/mɪˈnæki/ min-AK-ee), formerly part of the chain of Canadian National Hotels, was originally built in 1914 by the Grand Trunk Pacific Railway (GTPR). Located on the route of the National Transcontinental Railway (NTR) at Minaki, Ontario, between Sioux Lookout and Winnipeg, where the railway crosses the Winnipeg River, the rustic resort hotel named Minaki Lodge and the railway station, also called Minaki, is an Ojibwa word that has been variously translated as "beautiful water" or "good land."

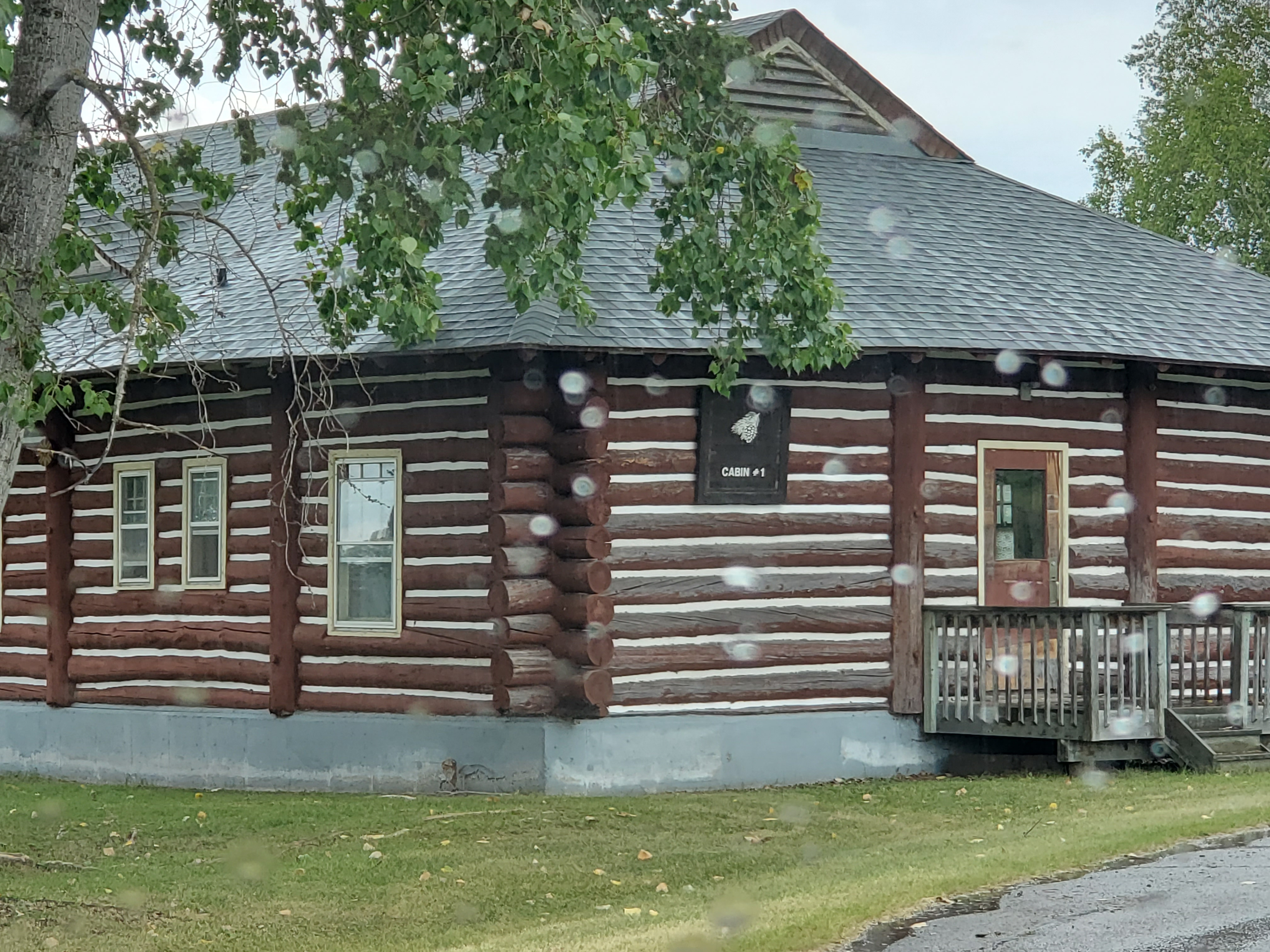
Guest cabin at Minaki Lodge

The NTR and GTPR went bankrupt and were nationalized as part of the Canadian National Railways. The CNR president, Sir Henry Thornton, rebuilt the hotel on a more lavish scale, but it burned down as it was about to open in 1925. Undaunted, he rebuilt it on an even more lavish scale using Scottish stonemasons, Swedish lot cutters and English gardeners to build and landscape a soaring granite and log building that opened in 1927. Thirty trainloads of soil were brought from a farm in Manitoba to build a golf course on the rock of the Canadian Shield.

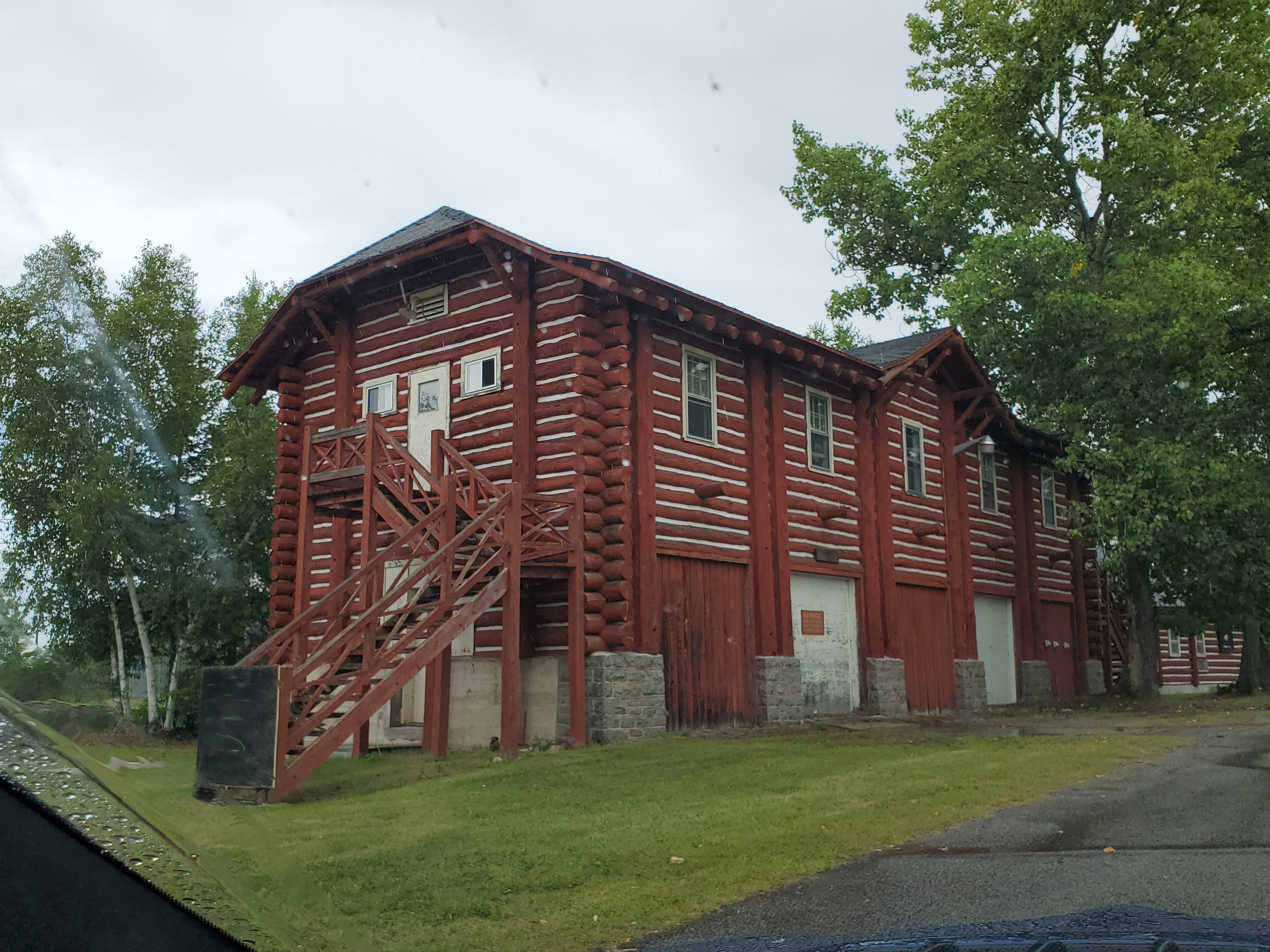
Mess cabin at Minaki Lodge

Minaki Lodge remained a luxurious resort until after the Second World War, but travel patterns changed and the railway, emphasizing freight and no longer interested in attracting passenger traffic, sold it in the early 1950s. Over the next 50 years, the hotel passed through many hands and many renovations. The Ontario government owned it for some years and spent an estimated $50 million on upgrading it, only to sell it to a hotel chain for $4 million. The Progressive Conservative government, which spent most of the money, called the resort the "Jewel of the North." Opposition Liberal and New Democratic Party politicians called it a boondoggle and a sinkhole. Owners since then have included a nearby Indian band, a Texan speculator and a Calgary real estate developer. The main building, which was not insured, burned to the ground in a spectacular fire in October 2003, and the resort has not operated since. The resort's nine-hole golf course has been tended only sporadically in recent years.

In 2012, former Manitoba cabinet minister Bob Banman and real estate developer Bob Schinkel submitted a plan to redevelop the former site of the lodge as condominium apartments and individually-owned cottages. The local cottagers' association opposed the development, expressing concerns about the project's sewage treatment facilities. In 2019, the Minaki Cottagers Association reported that the owners proposed a trailer park for the site.

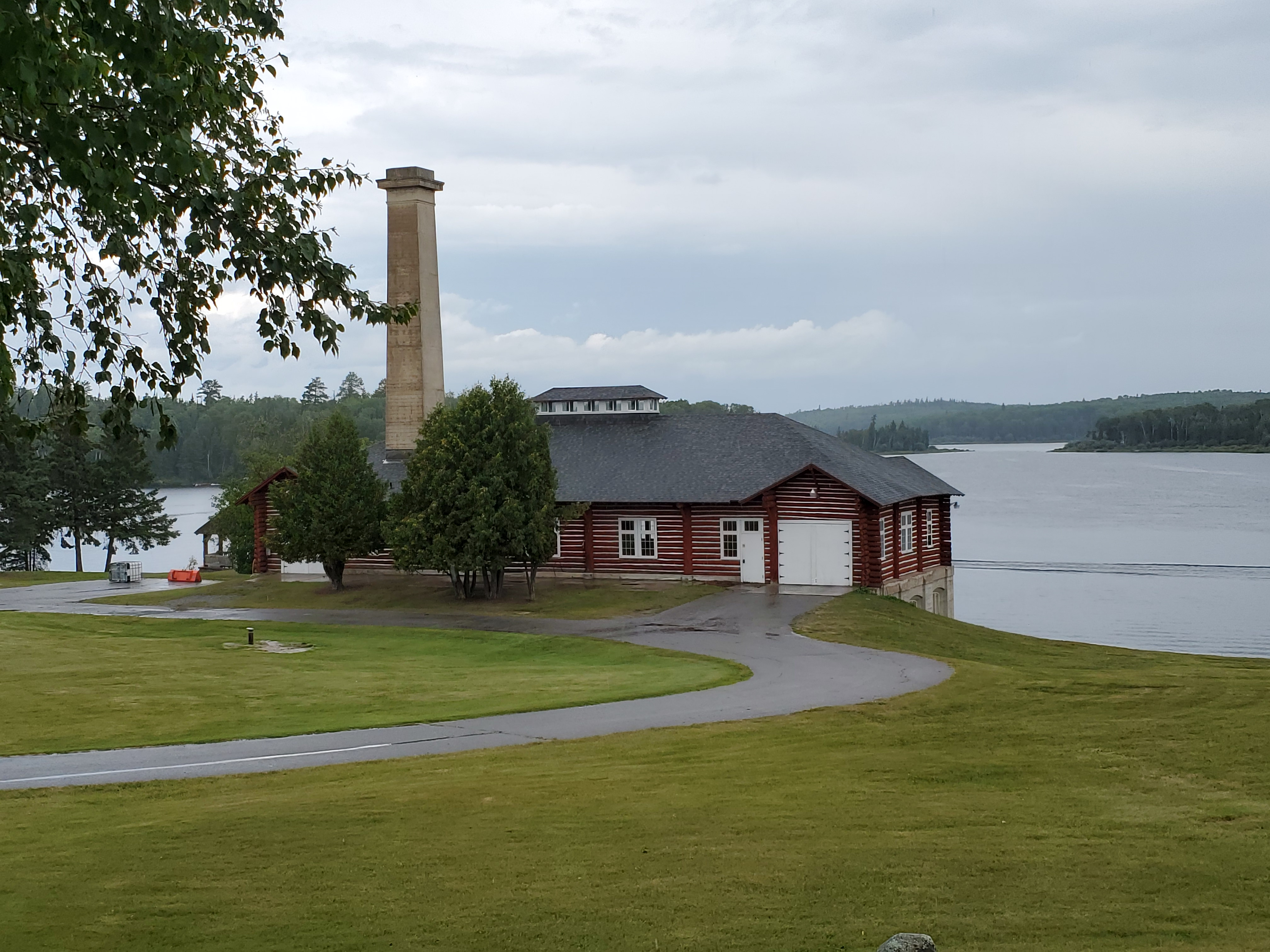
Minaki Lodge Power House building
