= Hotel Charlottetown =

Historic hotel in Charlottetown, Prince Edward Island, Canada

Rodd Charlottetown
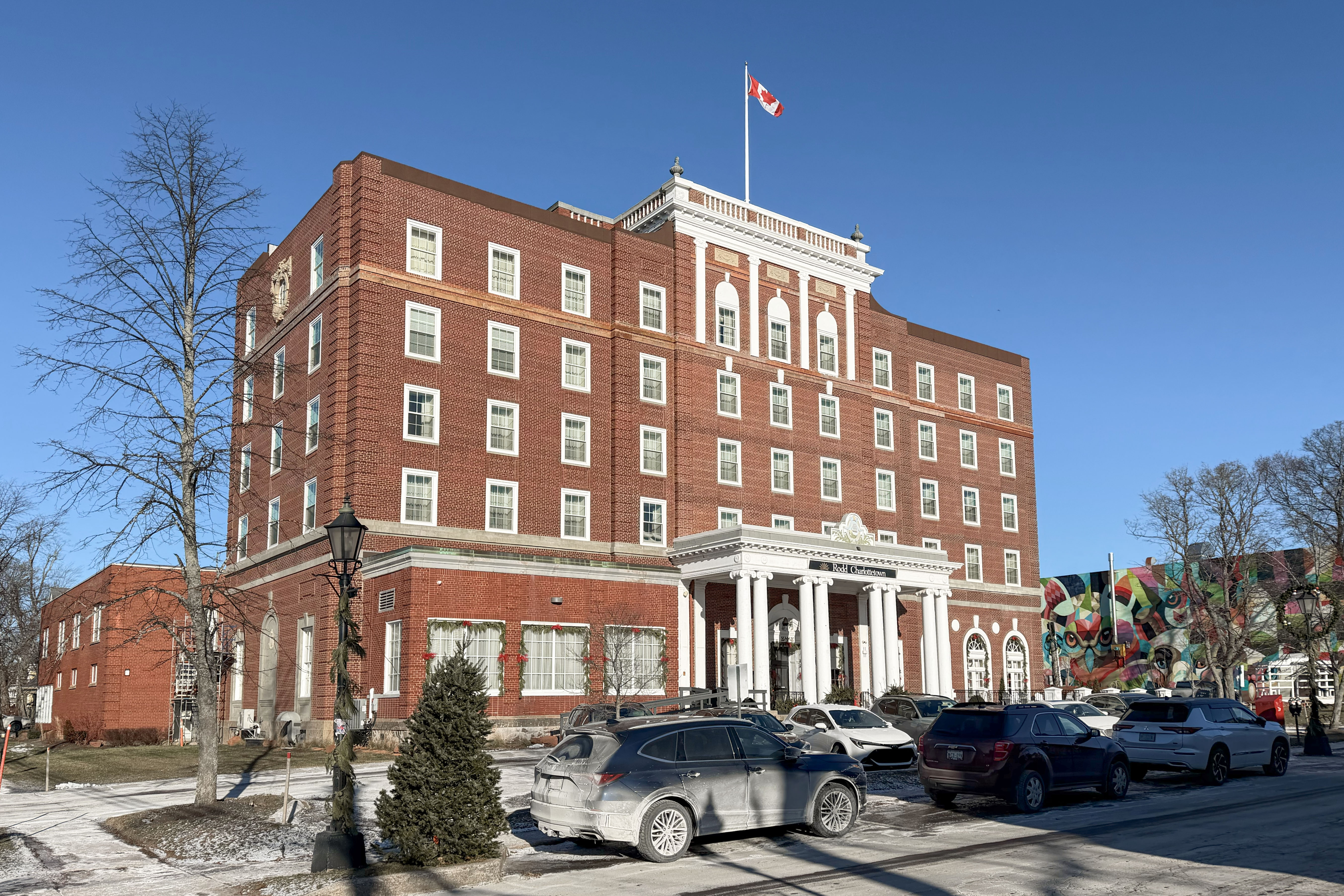
- Rodd Charlottetown in January 2026.
- Interactive map of the Rodd Charlottetown area
- Hotel chain: Rodd Hotels & Resorts

General information
- Location: 75 Kent Street; Charlottetown, Prince Edward Island; C1A 7K4
- Coordinates: 46°14′5″N 63°7′51″W
- Opening: 1931
- Owner: Rodd Hotels and Resorts
- Management: Rodd Hotels and Resorts

Technical details
- Floor count: 5

Other information
- Number of rooms: 115
- Number of suites: 7
- Number of restaurants: Chambers Restaurant & Bar
- Parking: yes

Website
- www.roddvacations.com/rodd-charlottetown

The Rodd Charlottetown is a historic hotel built in 1931 in Charlottetown, Prince Edward Island, Canada.

== History ==
After Charlottetown's main hotel, the Victoria Hotel, was destroyed by fire in 1929, the business leaders of the town appealed to the Canadian National Railway to construct a replacement. The Charlottetown Hotel was constructed by the CNR (through their lodging division, Canadian National Hotels) and opened on April 14, 1931.

Its most notable guests were Her Majesty Queen Elizabeth II and Prince Philip, Duke of Edinburgh, who stayed at the hotel during Prince Edward Island's centennial Confederation celebrations in July 1973.

Canadian National Hotels sold the property and there were several owners prior to the current one including Carl Burke (of airlines fame) and The Dale Corporation. The Dale Corporation went into Receivership in 1984 and the Hotel was sold to David Rodd's Rodd Hotels and Resorts . He operated it for many years as The Charlottetown, A Rodd Classic Hotel. Rodd funded a renovation and restoration project in 1999. The hotel was eventually renamed Rodd Charlottetown.
