= Walter S. Painter =

American architect

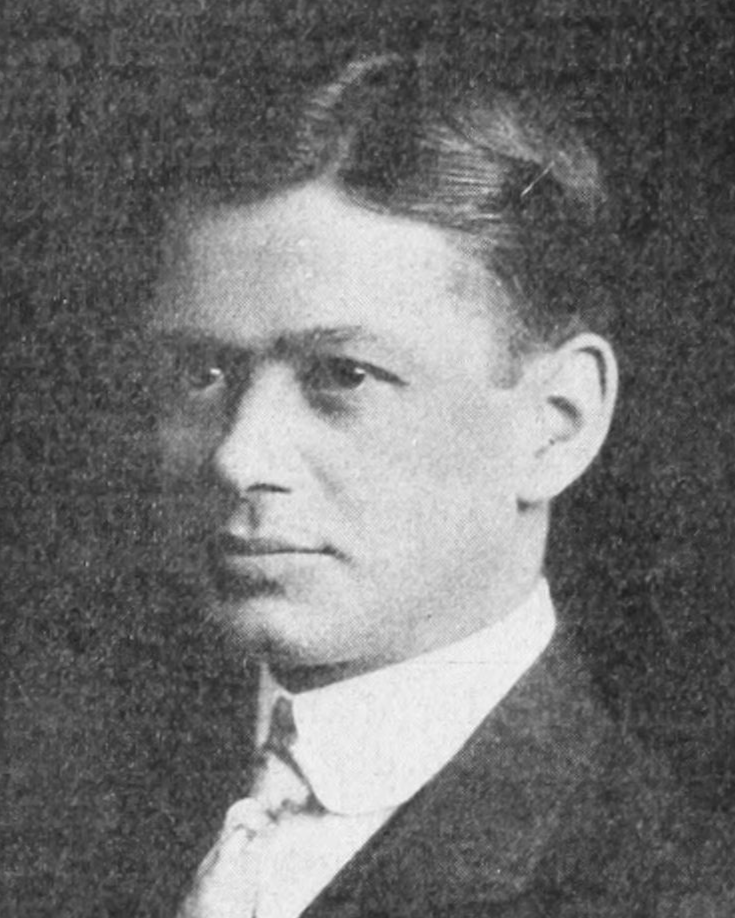
- Born: 15 February 1877; Reading, Pennsylvania, U.S
- Died: 22 February 1957 (aged 80); Banff, Alberta, Canada
- Spouse: Sallie Estella Renninger (m. 1906)

Walter Scott Painter (15 February 1877 – 22 February 1957) was an American architect who is chiefly noted for his work with the Canadian Pacific Railway as its chief architect. Painter's most significant works include the redesigned Banff Springs Hotel, the Cave and Basin Hot Springs bathhouse in Banff, Alberta and a series of railroad stations and hotels for the Canadian Pacific. In later life Painter worked with school designs in Chile, and promoted a system of prefabricated concrete houses.

Painter began his practice as a theater architect. Painter was chief designer with Canadian Pacific from 1906 to 1913. A partnership with Canadian architect Francis S. Swales lasted two years, from 1911-1912. Painter built a house at 533 Buffalo Street in Banff in 1913, close to the railroad and the Banff Springs Hotel, which has been preserved as a community arts centre.
