= List of historic places in the Northwest Territories =

This article is a list of historic places in the Northwest Territories entered on the Canadian Register of Historic Places. In Canada, historic places are formally recognized for their heritage value by a federal, provincial, territorial or municipal authority.

== List of historic places ==
Name	Address	Coordinates	Government recognition (CRHP №)	Wikidata ID	Image
Sahoyúé-§ehdacho National Historic Site	Grizzly Bear Mountain and Scented Grass Hills; Sahtu Region NT	65°39′04″N 121°42′07″W	Federal (13033)	Q15274363	More images
Déline Fishery / Franklin's Fort	Main Road; Deline NT	65°11′26″N 123°26′22″W	Federal (14385)	Q22974599	More images
Church of Our Lady of Good Hope	Fort Good Hope NT	66°15′08″N 128°38′42″W	Federal (1207)	Q3580199	More images
Fort McPherson National Historic Site	James Simon Rd; Fort McPherson NT	67°26′20″N 134°52′52″W	Federal (1141)	Q23940636	More images
Aviation Weather Station, Quarters / Storage Building 2	Fort Reliance NT	62°42′45″N 109°09′58″W	Federal (9907)	Q61439656	Upload Photo
Aviation Weather Station, Residence/ Radio Station Building	Fort Reliance NT	62°42′43″N 109°10′01″W	Federal (9909)	Q61439658	Upload Photo
Aviation Weather Station, Quarters / Storage Building 1	Fort Reliance NT	62°43′18″N 109°08′24″W	Federal (9919)	Q61439655	Upload Photo
Aviation Weather Station, Quarters / Storage Building 3	Fort Reliance NT	62°42′47″N 109°10′01″W	Federal (11004)	Q61439657	Upload Photo
Ice House	Fort Reliance NT	62°42′46″N 109°09′58″W	Federal (11165)	Q61439659	Upload Photo
Fort Reliance	Fort Reliance NT	62°28′15″N 108°33′43″W	Federal (15724), Northwest Territories (19348)	Q5471902	Upload Photo
Fort Resolution	Fort Resolution NT	61°10′15″N 113°40′16″W	Federal (15669)	Q23940685	More images
Ehdaa	Drum Cir; Fort Simpson NT	61°51′22″N 121°20′24″W	Federal (7758)	Q22974408	More images
Faille Cabin	Fort Simpson NT	61°51′55″N 121°21′32″W	Northwest Territories (10198)	Q132704242	Upload Photo
Old Barn	105 Ave; Fort Simpson NT	61°52′00″N 121°21′54″W	Northwest Territories (10329)	Q132704369	Upload Photo
Hudson's Bay Company Shed	Fort Simpson NT	61°51′38″N 121°21′04″W	Northwest Territories (10434)	Q132704463	Upload Photo
Lafferty House	Fort Simpson NT	61°52′08″N 121°22′12″W	Northwest Territories (10435)	Q132704549	Upload Photo
McPherson House	Corner of 93 Ave and MacKenzie Dr; Fort Simpson NT	61°51′34″N 121°20′38″W	Northwest Territories (10436)	Q132704618	Upload Photo
Fort Smith Mission	Mercredi Ave at Breynat Street; Fort Smith NT	60°00′14″N 111°52′48″W	Northwest Territories (1241)	Q30016713	Upload Photo
Warden's Patrol Cabin	Wood Buffalo National Park NT	60°16′00″N 114°10′01″W	Federal (4337)	Q41283273	Upload Photo
Hay River Mission Sites	Hay River Reserve NT	60°48′55″N 115°47′49″W	Federal (12080)	Q22975451	More images
Kittigazuit Archaeological Sites	Mackenzie Delta; Inuvik NT	69°20′30″N 133°41′24″W	Federal (15001)	Q22975203	Upload Photo
Parry's Rock Wintering Site	Melville Island; Resolute, Nunavut NT	74°46′00″N 110°37′59″W	Federal (11660)	Q3437594	More images
Nagwichoonjik	Tsiigehtchic NT	67°26′32″N 133°44′20″W	Federal (9161)	Q22974983	More images
Old Anglican Church of Tulita	Tulita NT	64°54′30″N 125°43′05″W	Northwest Territories (1243)	Q132704686	Upload Photo
Bank of Toronto	7A Otto Drive; Yellowknife NT	62°28′12″N 114°20′38″W	Yellowknife municipality (1239)	Q19876356	More images
Hudsons Bay Warehouse	3501 Wiley Road; Yellowknife NT	62°28′01″N 114°20′53″W	Yellowknife municipality (1242)	Q19874424	More images
Weaver & Devore Trading	3535 Wiley Road; Yellowknife NT	62°27′53″N 114°21′00″W	Yellowknife municipality (1244)	Q7978348	More images
Wildcat Cafe	3509 Wiley Road; Yellowknife NT	62°28′00″N 114°20′56″W	Yellowknife municipality (1246)	Q7774930	More images
Canadian Pacific Air Float Base	3502 Wiley Road; Yellowknife NT	62°28′02″N 114°20′53″W	Yellowknife municipality (1278)	Q19876768	More images
Fireweed Studio	5210 49th Avenue; Yellowknife NT	62°27′14″N 114°22′37″W	Yellowknife municipality (1279)	Q20006828	More images
Yellowknife Post Office	4902 Franklin Avenue; Yellowknife NT	62°27′17″N 114°22′16″W	Yellowknife municipality (10234)	Q20006975	More images
School House	5402 Franklin Avenue; Yellowknife NT	62°27′07″N 114°22′36″W	Yellowknife municipality (1255)	Q20006837	More images
Back Bay Cemetery	Yellowknife NT	62°28′11″N 114°21′54″W	Yellowknife municipality (1280)	Q19876343	More images
Whalers' Graves	Balaena Bay; Parry Peninsula NT	70°02′35″N 124°55′53″W	Northwest Territories (1245)	Q132704781	Upload Photo
Pokiak Territorial Historic Site	Across Peel Channel from Aklavik; Aklavik NT	68°12′37″N 134°59′10″W	Northwest Territories (17861)	Q116482427	Upload Photo
Teetshik Goghaa (Old Arctic Red) Territorial Historic Site	East bank of Mackenzie River 11km downstream from Tsiigehtchic; Tsiigehtchic NT	67°31′45″N 133°51′14″W	Northwest Territories (19345)	Q116482415	Upload Photo
Nataiinlaii (Eight Miles) Territorial Historic Site	Eight miles up the Peel River from Fort McPherson; Fort McPherson NT	67°20′01″N 134°51′59″W	Northwest Territories (19708)	Q132704865	More images
Nagwichoo tshik (Mouth of the Peel)	50km downstream from Fort McPherson on the south shore at the mouth of the Peel River; Fort McPherson NT	67°41′11″N 134°34′04″W	Northwest Territories (19709)	Q132704933	Upload Photo
Old Fort Providence	Wool Bay; Great Slave Lake NT	62°17′06″N 114°06′03″W	Northwest Territories (19713)	Q7084036	Upload Photo
Khaii Luk Tshik	Khaii Luk Tshik; NT	67°28′2.60″N 131°29′53.16″W	Federal (19704)	Q132704998	Upload Photo
Knut Lang's Place	Knut Lang's Place; NT	68°0′24.001″N 135°4′0.998″W	Federal (19719)	Q116482424	Upload Photo

== See also ==
- List of National Historic Sites of Canada in the Northwest Territories
