= List of National Historic Sites of Canada in the Northwest Territories =

This is a list of National Historic Sites (French: Lieux historiques nationaux du Canada) in the territory of Northwest Territories. There are 12 National Historic Sites designated in the Northwest Territories, of which one (Sahoyúé-§ehdacho) is administered by Parks Canada (identified below by the beaver icon). The first National Historic Site to be designated in the Northwest Territories was Parry's Rock Wintering Site in 1930.

A number of National Historic Events also occurred in the Northwest Territories, and are identified at places associated with them, using the same style of federal plaque which marks National Historic Sites. Several National Historic Persons are commemorated in the same way. The markers do not indicate which designation—a Site, Event, or Person—a subject has been given.

This list uses names designated by the national Historic Sites and Monuments Board, which may differ from other names for these sites.

== National Historic Sites ==
Site	Date(s)	Designated	Location	Description	Image
Church of Our Lady of Good Hope	1885 (completed)	1977	Fort Good Hope; 66°15′6.84″N 128°38′38.04″W	Early northern Oblate mission church, illustrative of northern mission churches in a simplified version of the Gothic Revival Style; one of the oldest surviving buildings of this type	interior of Church of Our Lady of Good Hope
Déline Fishery / Franklin's Fort	1825-7 (wintering site)	1996	Deline; 65°11′11″N 123°24′57″W	The archaeological remains of a fort on the site of a traditional seasonal fishery, constructed as the wintering quarters of Sir John Franklin and his second expedition; symbolic of the 19th-century relationship between Aboriginal people in the north and Euro-Canadian exploration parties	
Ehdaa		2002	Fort Simpson; 61°51′33″N 121°20′35″W	Traditional gathering site for the Dene which continues to be used for important events, including the signing of Treaty 11 in 1921 and Pope John Paul II's visit in 1987	People gathered at Ehdaa
Fort McPherson	1840 (established)	1969	Fort McPherson; 67°26′7″N 134°52′55″W	The principal Hudson's Bay Company trading post in the MacKenzie Delta region for over 50 years, and a centre of missionary activity; the first North-West Mounted Police post in the Western Arctic	The wooden church and a maple leaf flag on a flagpole at Fort McPherson
Fort Reliance	1833 (established)	1953	Great Slave Lake; 62°42′46″N 109°9′53″W	The remains of a Hudson's Bay Company fort built as a base of operations for an expedition by George Back, and later used as a trading post in the 1850s. The ruins are surrounded by the proposed Thaidene Nene National Park. If realized, the park and the National Historic Site would join the park system as two units.	
Fort Resolution	1819 (established)	1973	Fort Resolution; 61°10′14″N 113°40′16″W	A small, rectangular-shaped peninsula on which first stood a North West Company fur post and later a Hudson's Bay Company store; the oldest continuously occupied place in the Northwest Territories with origins in the fur trade	Great Slave Lake at Fort Resolution
Fort Simpson	1804 (established)	1969	Fort Simpson; 61°51′36″N 121°20′37″W	A traditional aboriginal meeting place at the junction of the Liard and Mackenzie Rivers where the North West Company and Hudson's Bay Company constructed trading posts	Mackenzie River from Fort Simpson
Hay River Mission Sites	1868 (established)	1992	Hay River Reserve; 60°51′28″N 115°43′26″W	A complex of mission buildings and associated cemeteries; the missions were located at the centre of a 4,000-kilometre (2,500 mi) inland water route, and are symbolic of the meeting of Dene and European cultures	View of the side facade of Ste. Anne's Roman Catholic Church, with corner towers and projecting spire, and teepees
Kittigazuit Archaeological Sites	1400 c.(occupation begins)	1978	Inuvik Region; 69°20′25″N 133°41′50″W	An archaeological site on Kittigazuit Island, occupied continuously circa 1400 to 1900 and the location of the largest known seasonal gatherings of Inuit in Northern Canada; traditional Beluga hunting station by the ancestors of today's occupants of Inuvik and Tuktoyaktuk	Kittigazuit photographed by Isaac O. Stringer, circa 1910
Nagwichoonjik (Mackenzie River)		1997	Tsiigehtchic; 67°27′9″N 133°44′54″W	A cultural landscape of cultural, social and spiritual significance, along the section of the Mackenzie River which traverses the traditional lands of the Gwichya Gwich'in	
Parry's Rock Wintering Site	1819 (wintering site)	1930	Melville Island; 74°46′2″N 110°38′8″W	A large sandstone rock, approximately 5.5 metres (18 ft) long and 3 metres (9.8 ft) high, marking the 1819 wintering site of William Parry's expedition of the Northwest Passage	A group of men standing in front of Parry's wintering rock in 1909
Saoyú-ʔehdacho		1997	Great Bear Lake; 65°20′0.63″N 121°0′5.9″W	A sacred site for the Sahtu people; the largest National Historic Site (approximately the size of Prince Edward Island) and the first one designated and acquired through consultation with Aboriginal peoples	

== See also ==
- History of Northwest Territories
- List of historic places in Northwest Territories
