= Yellowknife Post Office =

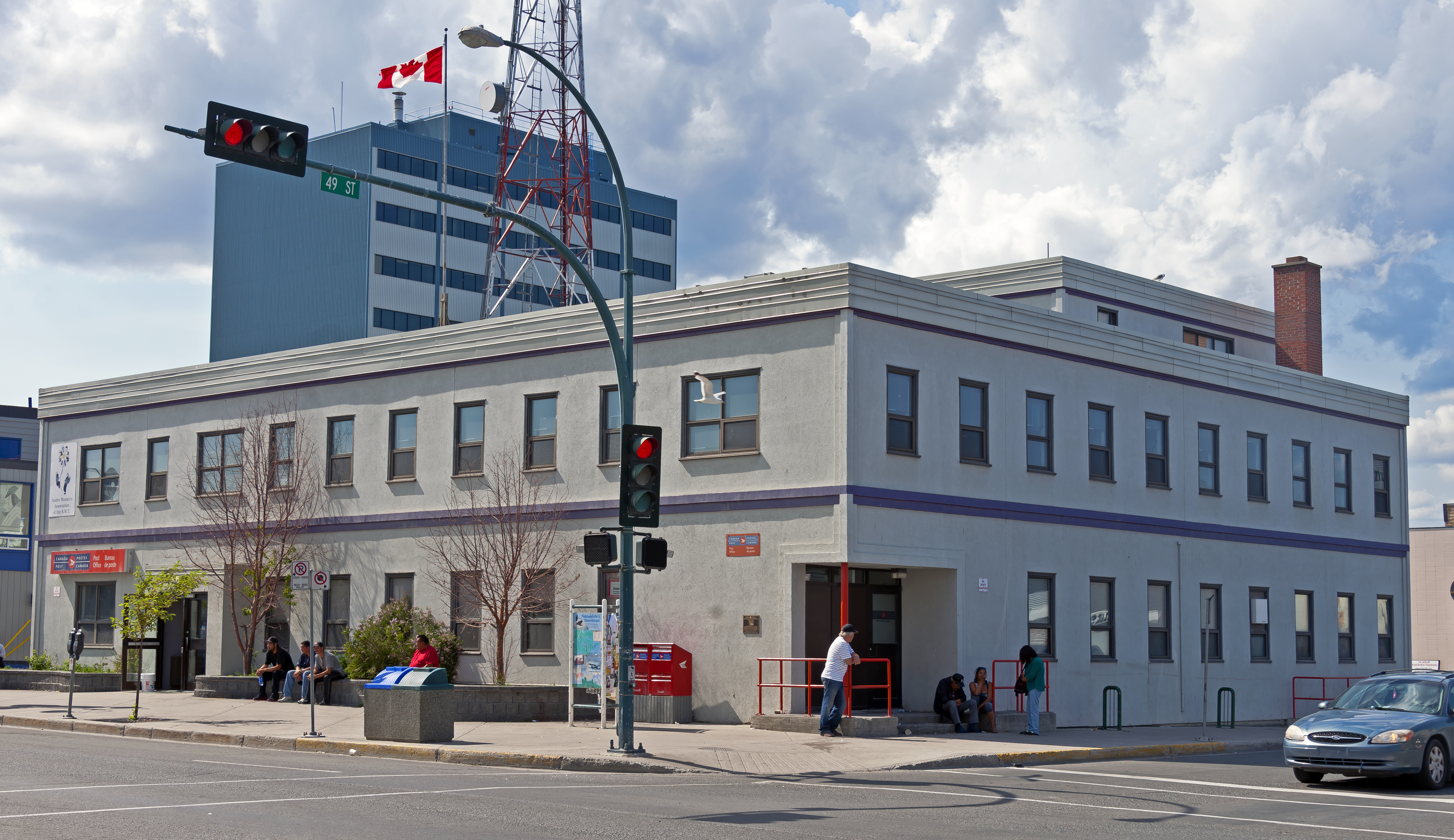
- East (front) elevation and south profile, 2015

- Location within Northwest Territories

General information
- Architectural style: Modernist
- Location: 4902 Franklin Ave., Yellowknife, Northwest Territories, Canada
- Coordinates: 62.45464°N 114.37111°W
- Current tenants: Canada Post
- Construction started: 1955
- Opened: 1956
- Renovated: 1958
- Owner: 6133 NWT Ltd.

Technical details
- Material: Wood, concrete
- Floor count: 2

Design and construction
- Main contractor: C.H. Whitham, Ltd.
- Designations: City of Yellowknife Heritage Site. Canadian Register of Historic Places #10234.

Renovating team
- Main contractor: Ivor Johnson

The Post Office building for Yellowknife, Northwest Territories, Canada, serving the X1A postal codes, is located at the southwest corner of 49th Street and Franklin (50th) Avenue. It is a two-storey concrete building in a late modernist style dating to the mid-20th century. In 2006 it was designated a City of Yellowknife Heritage Site in recognition of its long standing role as a social centrepiece for the downtown community; it has been administratively listed on the Canadian Register of Historic Places as a result. "This is where you went to find everybody" in the 1960s, one city councillor recalled when the building received its heritage plaque in 2010.

It was the first federal government building constructed in what is now referred to as Yellowknife's New Town. The city had begun during the 1930s as a gold mining community on a peninsula and islands in the bay named for it on Great Slave Lake. When the boom resumed after World War II, it quickly outgrew the space available there, and New Town began to develop to the south on higher ground. The post office was completed in 1956 as the centralized, downtown location for mail services for Canada Post; it also housed the territorial courts until 1978. Both functions made it an important civic presence that helped establish New Town.

During later decades, the building lost some of its prominence, as federal agencies that had been housed there moved elsewhere in downtown Yellowknife for more space and the city grew too large for all of its residents to receive their mail there through general delivery. It underwent some physical changes as well. A 1958 renovation added a rear pavilion, and a fire ten years later resulted in the reconstruction of the upper floor. In the 1990s it was extensively renovated and underwent significant changes to its exterior although the building's basic form remains. In 2010 it was deemed surplus. Since 2010 it has been privately owned and leased back to Canada Post. In 2014 the city's removal of the benches in response to complaints about the behaviour of local homeless people led to a sit-in protest by local residents.

== Building ==
The post office is situated on a corner lot in an urban area of low- and high-rise buildings with some parking lots interspersed amid a grid pattern of numbered streets and avenues. This level and type of development continues for several blocks in all directions. The terrain is generally level, at the top of a rise coming up from the lake, roughly 186–190 metres (610–623 ft) in elevation.

On the opposite side of 49th Street, the intersection's northwest corner, is a bank branch, with the seven-storey YK Centre office building just down the street. The northeast corner is occupied by a six-story modernist building that houses some territorial government offices. Across 50th Avenue, signed and referred to as Franklin Avenue, is a fast-food restaurant on the corner and the entrance to the Centre Square Mall complex, topped with a three-storey hotel and, a block to the east, the 60-metre-high (200 ft) Northern Heights tower, Yellowknife's tallest building. Southwest of the building is a tall radio transmission tower.

The building itself is a two-storey 10-by-10-bay timber frame structure faced in concrete with a flat roof. In the eastern section of the north (rear) elevation a nested pavilion three bays wide rises to an additional storey; an attached square brick chimney rises to its east. On the north and east are broad stone tiled sidewalks with shrubbery and decorative tree plantings enclosed by low stone walls on the latter. A parking lot roughly equal in area to the building is located on its west; to the south is an unnamed alley.

Fenestration on the facades facing the streets consists of casement windows with a large single pane over a smaller one. On the ground floor, the southernmost bay of the east face is set with a double window. Next to it is a projecting secondary entrance set with modern metal and glass doors sheltered by a flat concrete roof.

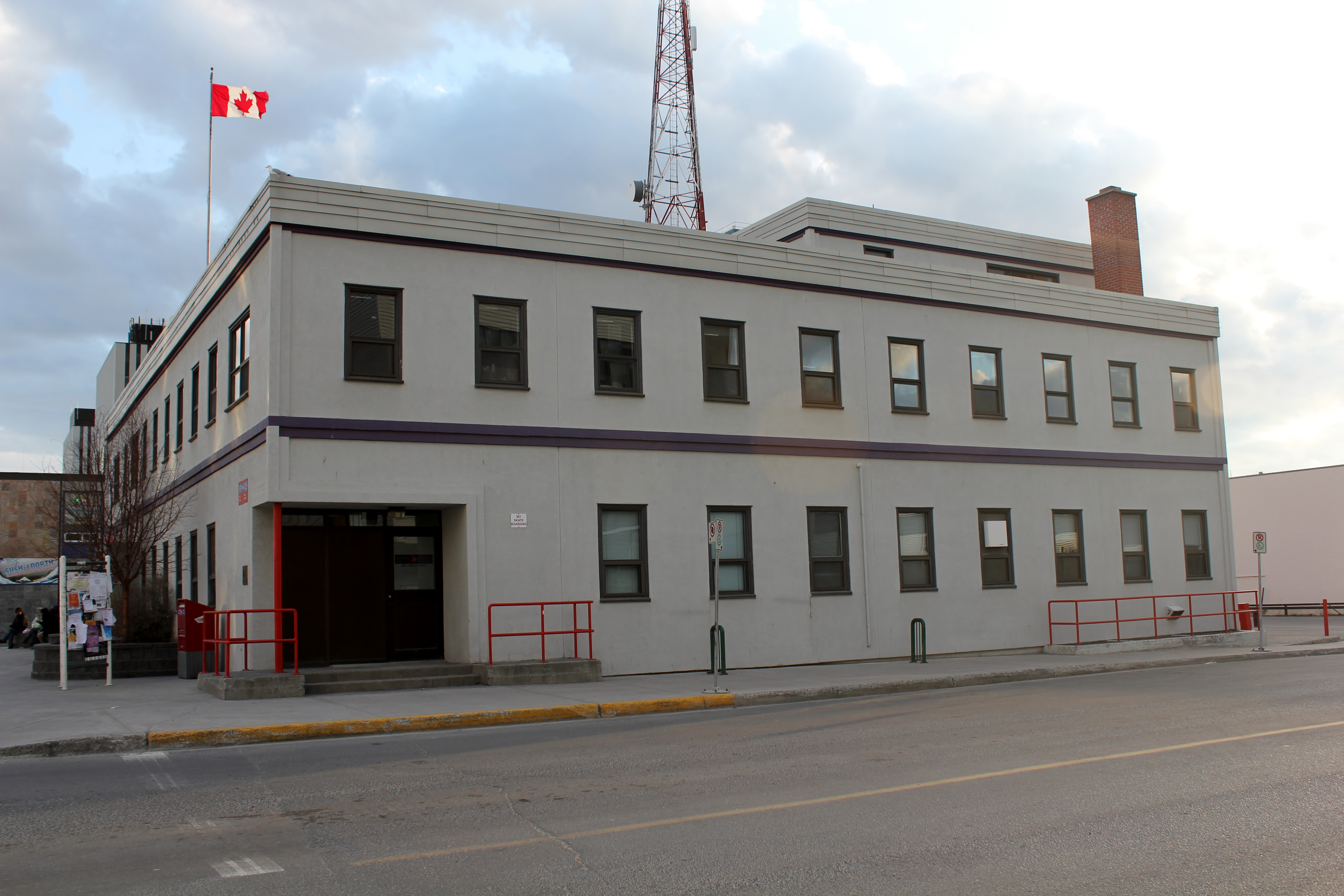
North elevation

The last bay on the north end is blind, with the main entrance recessed into the corner and fronted by a low porch with metal railings. A single round metal pillar supports the upper story within the recess. Two projecting plain strips surround the entryway, with a similar quoin rising from the top. The bay to the west is blind as well.

A projecting course of flat strips similar to those in the quoins divides the second storey from the first. Like its counterpart below, the southernmost window on the east is doubled. This treatment is also accorded the third bay, above the secondary entrance, and the northernmost bay. The east facade has the single windows in all ten bays.

On the south side, the first story has three single windows, two blind bays, three more windows and a garage with a metal door. The second story has, from the east, three single windows, a double, a blind bay and then a double followed by four singles. The west (rear) facade has no windows and only an opaque service door on the east side of the pavilion; a chainlink fence on the other side encloses the building's mechanicals. Above it are two windows spaced a bay apart, the only windows on the west.

The roofline is marked by a frieze of flat metal plates in strips with small cornices between. At the northern end of the east facade are an irregular set of empty bolt holes. In the center of the roof along eastern side a flagpole rises. An air handler is located in the northeast corner. The upper story of the pavilion has the same treatments as the rest of the building. On its north facade are two windows, one the same single casement type seen elsewhere on the building, the other a triple.

== History ==
From Yellowknife's beginnings as a gold mining boomtown in the mid-1930s, a building to house federal government offices, including Canada Post, in the center of town had been planned, but never built. In the years after World War II, when development resumed, the plans remained. By 1950 the current lot had been reserved for the purpose.

Funding was not available until 1955. That year construction started, and by the following April the building was open and serving customers. A formal ribbon-cutting ceremony was held in July. The post office occupied the first floor, with government offices and courts upstairs.

It was the first federal building in Yellowknife's New Town. As in many other communities in the Canadian North, the post office quickly became a center of social and community life. Many residents used general delivery instead of a street address and came there daily to pick up their mail, often lingering on the benches and sidewalks outside when the weather permitted. It was also adjacent to the nearby Sutherland's Drug Store, where residents often shopped, further establishing the area as the centre of town.

At the time of construction, the building had a coal chimney but no coal furnace. The unused chimney was later filled in with sand and dirt. In 1958 the building was expanded slightly, with the addition of the rear pavilion.

During the 1960s, different government agencies, including the Canadian Wildlife Service, the Department of Energy and Mines and the Canada Manpower Centre, located in the building. At times some of the space was even rented as private apartments. In 1968 a fire in the upper storey required that it be gutted, and the rest of the building suffered fire and water damage.

In the 1970s, with the city's population growing rapidly, the implementation of letter carrier delivery to individual houses was considered. It was found not to be workable at that time, and general delivery continued to be the preferred method of receiving mail. The courts moved to a new building nearby in 1978.

The population growth continued. Early in the 1980s general delivery to the population became less and less feasible. In 1982 post office boxes were offered, and later in the decade carrier service to residents was finally implemented, with Yellowknife's original postal code of X0E 1H0 ended gradually and replaced with the current X1A Forward Sortation Code.

During the 1990s the building was renovated again, altering its exterior appearance significantly as a new facade and windows were installed. Nevertheless, enough of its original materials remained for it be listed on the Canadian Register of Historic Places in 2006, in recognition of its role in catalyzing the development of Yellowknife's New Town and providing a centre for the growing community. The city council formally designated it a city heritage site the following year. "[W]hen I was a young woman in this town, this is where you went to find everybody," recalled city councillor Amanda Mallon.

Public Works Canada, however, refused to allow the city to affix an informational plaque to the building, since it was still owned by the federal government. In 2010, the government decided to surplus the building, and a private concern, 6133 NWT Ltd., a partnership between Denendeh Investments and JV Development, took over ownership. Canada Post leased its former space and continued operations. The new owners allowed the city to affix a plaque early that year.

Four years later, the city removed the benches from the sidewalks in front of the post office after postal workers and patrons complained that homeless people loitering there after a nearby shelter had been closed were harassing them, drinking and urinating on the building. The owners had asked that the planters be removed as well to eliminate all sitting space, and indicated it would look for some means to discourage people from sitting on them in the meantime. A local teenager organized a sit-in protest on Facebook in response, attracting others to bring their lawn chairs and sit in front of the post office during lunch hour. "[H]omeless people in Yellowknife are being treated like animals, and no one deserves that," she told a reporter.

Many other residents supported the protest, saying they had never experienced any problems with the people sitting on the benches. One postal worker said she had no complaints and found the city's response overly harsh, likening it to "grade school when a few kids are misbehaving and the whole class ends up getting in trouble." Mark Heyck, the city's mayor, said removing the benches was a temporary measure as the city looked for long-term solutions to address the problem.

== See also ==
- List of historic places in the Northwest Territories
