= Log School House =

Building in the Northwest Territories, Canada

Coordinates: 62°27′07″N 114°22′36″W

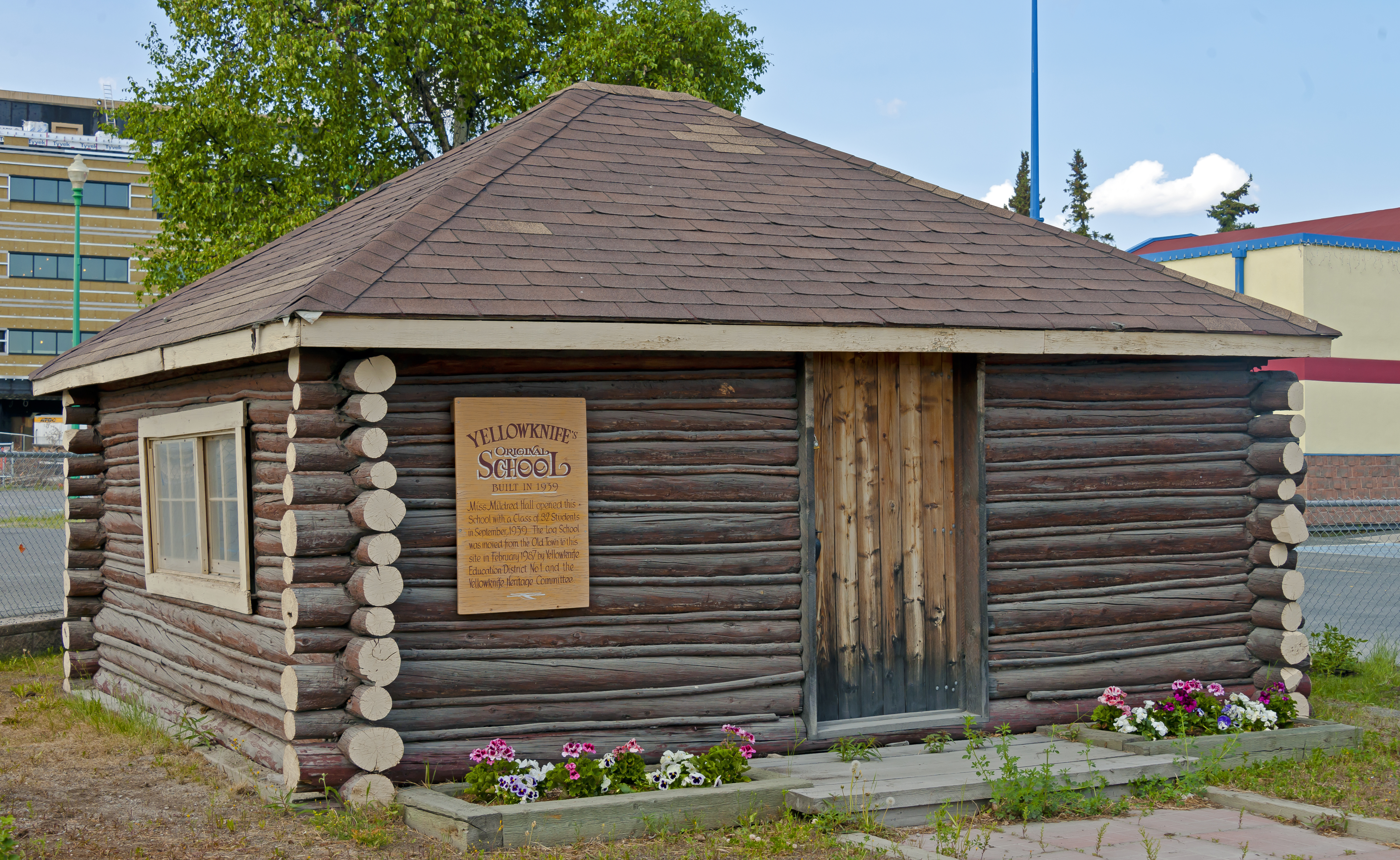
Original Yellowknife School House, 2015

The first building used as a school in Yellowknife, Northwest Territories, Canada, is currently located on Franklin (50th) Avenue at the south end of New Town, the city's downtown section. It is a small log cabin dating to the mid-1930s. It was designated a City of Yellowknife Heritage Site in 1998, and listed on the Canadian Register of Historic Places in 2004.

Originally built by a local gold mining company, it was repurposed as a school in 1938, as the city's population had grown rapidly enough to require a school. Yellowknife Education District No. 1 was created to manage the school; its school board was the first democratically elected government body in the territory. Even with a 20-member student body, it was small enough that classes had to be held in two sessions; they were often interrupted by passing miners gawking or mistaking the building for a bar.

After two years, the new district moved to larger quarters to accommodate a growing population, and eventually the district was able to build its own school. the log cabin then became a laundry and private residence in later years before being offered to the city as a historical site. In 1987, the building was moved from its original location in Old Town to its present location on Mildred Hall elementary school property where it has since been restored to provide tours of early education in Yellowknife. It is currently closed to the public; eventual plans are to use it as a museum of Yellowknife's early educational history.

== Building ==
The building is located on the west side of Franklin (50th) Avenue opposite 54th Street, at the south end of downtown Yellowknife, known locally as New Town. It is in between the offices of Yellowknife Education District No. 1 and Mildred Hall School, both of which are set further back from the street. On the east side of Franklin is the modern high-rise Yellowknife campus of Aurora College.

To the north along Franklin is the city's main business district, with more modern high-rise buildings including several of Yellowknife's tallest. Hotels line the street for several blocks to the south. Along the west side, the school complex gives way to residential neighbourhoods around 57th Street. The surrounding terrain is generally level, as the high ground of about 198 metres (650 ft) in elevation at the crest of the rise from Yellowknife Bay of Great Slave Lake 1 km (1.6 miles) to the east and the smaller Frame Lake 200 metres (660 ft) to the west.

A chainlink fence sets off the building itself and its short concrete walk from the sidewalk. It is a log cabin, 4.9 by 5.5 metres (16 by 18 ft), one storey high on a concrete foundation topped by a shingled hipped roof. Two small planters and a low wooden stoop are in front.

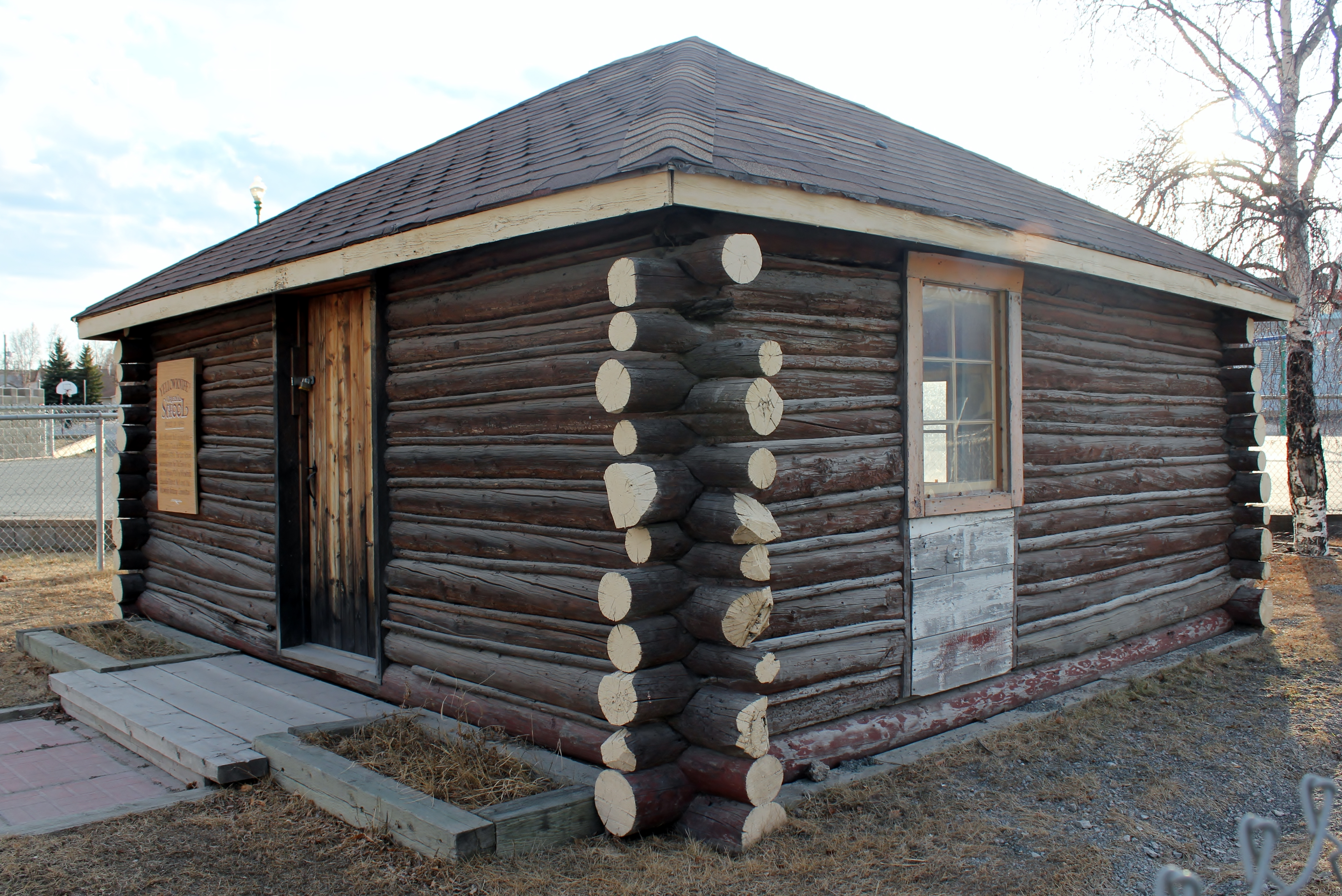
View of north facade

The main entrance is in the centre of the east (front) facade; it is set with a door of untreated vertical board and padlocked. The bay to its west has a wooden interpretive plaque where a window was once located. On the south facade there is a horizontal double-hung sliding sash window with six square panes on the west and four on the east set in a plain wooden surround. On the opposite side is a single six-pane casement window with the same wooden surround and wooden paneling covering the logs below. The west (rear) facade also has a single window. A narrow plain frieze at the end of the eave sets off the roofline.

== History ==
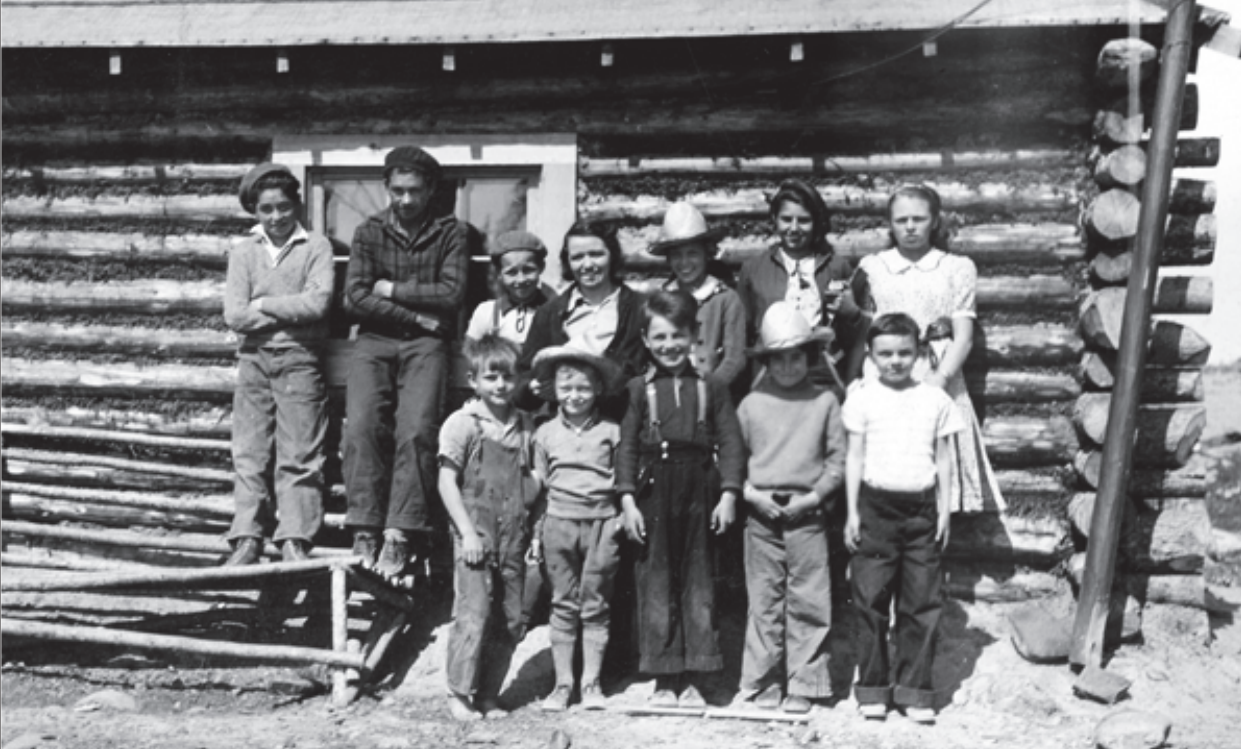
Teacher Mildred Hall had to teach her students in shifts.

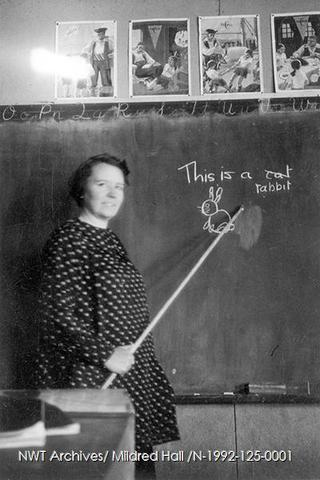
Teacher Mildred Hall had to make do with limited resources.

Gold had been discovered in the area of what became Yellowknife around the turn of the 20th century. But the quantities were too small to warrant serious exploration. A small settlement grew in the 1920s around the fuel caches left by bush pilots, who used it as a staging area for flights further north.

That changed with the discovery of more significant and accessible deposits in the area's greenstone belts in 1935. Within Yellowknife became a boomtown, its population reaching a thousand within a couple of years. Most development was concentrated along the peninsula projecting into Yellowknife Bay, the area today known as Old Town. "Life there is rough, lusty and loud," reported Life magazine in 1938, "but it is also businesslike ... There is civic agitation for a public school." That opinion had been expressed by a local newspaper, which editorialized that a school was "[one of] the first necessities of any organized community ... This situation requires immediate attention."

By November, as the area's long, cold and dark winter was beginning, Yellowknife's citizens took action. A provisional school board was established, and CDN$1,000 ($20,400 today) raised from a combination of local contributions and a federal government grant. Informal classes began at the end of January 1939. They were held at first in one resident's home; another resident, D.A. Davies, volunteered to teach them.

Both building and teacher were meant as temporary measures until a dedicated building and a qualified teacher could be found. The former, a log cabin built by two local men the year before for use as a bunkhouse and kitchen, was rented from its owner, the Mining Corporation of Canada, as classes began. At the end of February 1939, Davies was replaced by Mildred Hall, a teacher certified in Alberta who had expressed interest in the position when the school was established but had been prevented from travelling north to Yellowknife from her Fitzgerald home due to the winter conditions until then.

Hall faced challenging conditions in the cabin. It did not have enough space for all her 20 students, so classes were held in shifts. To keep it warm in temperatures as cold as −50 °F (−46 °C) it was necessary to keep all the windows and doors closed; letting in fresh air invariably chilled the building and its occupants. Its location, on what is now Pilots Lane, next to paths to Glamour Alley, as Yellowknife's bar district was known at the time, meant that drunken miners and prospectors would often gawk through the windows as they passed by, interrupting classes. "Once," Hall recalled later, "two illuminated miners appeared in the doorway and wanted to buy a drink."

The teacher faced educational challenges as well. Older students, who had often foregone a year or two of schooling since their families moved to Yellowknife, had to be brought up to the appropriate grade level, despite the lack of textbooks. Younger ones had to be kept busy and educated, similarly without any of the materials a teacher would usually have. In springtime, as the ice on the lake melted enough for floatplanes to come through, those shortcomings were remedied as teaching materials and textbooks were delivered. The lengthening days and Hall's growing rapport with her students helped improve matters further, and at the end of the school year, a graduation ceremony was held for the 12 students who had completed their education; each received a silver dollar.

Yellowknife had established a school; now it needed to make it last. Near the end of the summer, as World War II loomed, the three-member provisional school board yielded to a formal board. It was the first democratically elected local government body in the history of the Northwest Territories. A little over a month later, they formally established what is now Yellowknife Education District No. 1 and enacted a six-mill property tax to replace the lotteries and donations that had previously funded the school.

Classes began in September again, in the log cabin, with 21 students. Hall surveyed the students with an eye toward how a larger building might better meet their needs, and by the end of the year a larger bunkhouse had been found and rented. This building was large enough to partition living quarters for Hall separate from the classroom (she had not, however, lived in the original building, as is sometimes believed).

After the school moved to a larger building, the cabin went through a variety of other uses. At first it was a laundry. Later owners lived there, or used it for storage. In 1987 it was sold to the city government, realizing its importance, decided to make efforts to preserve it, and move it from Old Town to the Abe Miller Centre on 53rd Street.

In 1998 the city designated it a Heritage Building; two years later it was moved to its present location in front of the elementary school named after Hall and the district offices. In 2006 the cabin made the Canadian Register of Historic Places. Two years after that women in the Red Hat Society put in the planters and fence, making plans to restore some period furniture to the interior and open it as a living museum, with one member playing Hall in period dress.

It served as a one-room schoolhouse.

== See also ==
- Fireweed Studio, another relocated log cabin from the early mining days, located nearby and also listed by the city and the Canadian Register
- List of historic places in the Northwest Territories
