= Fireweed Studio =

Log cabin in Northwest Territories, Canada

Coordinates: 62.45387°N 114.37720°W

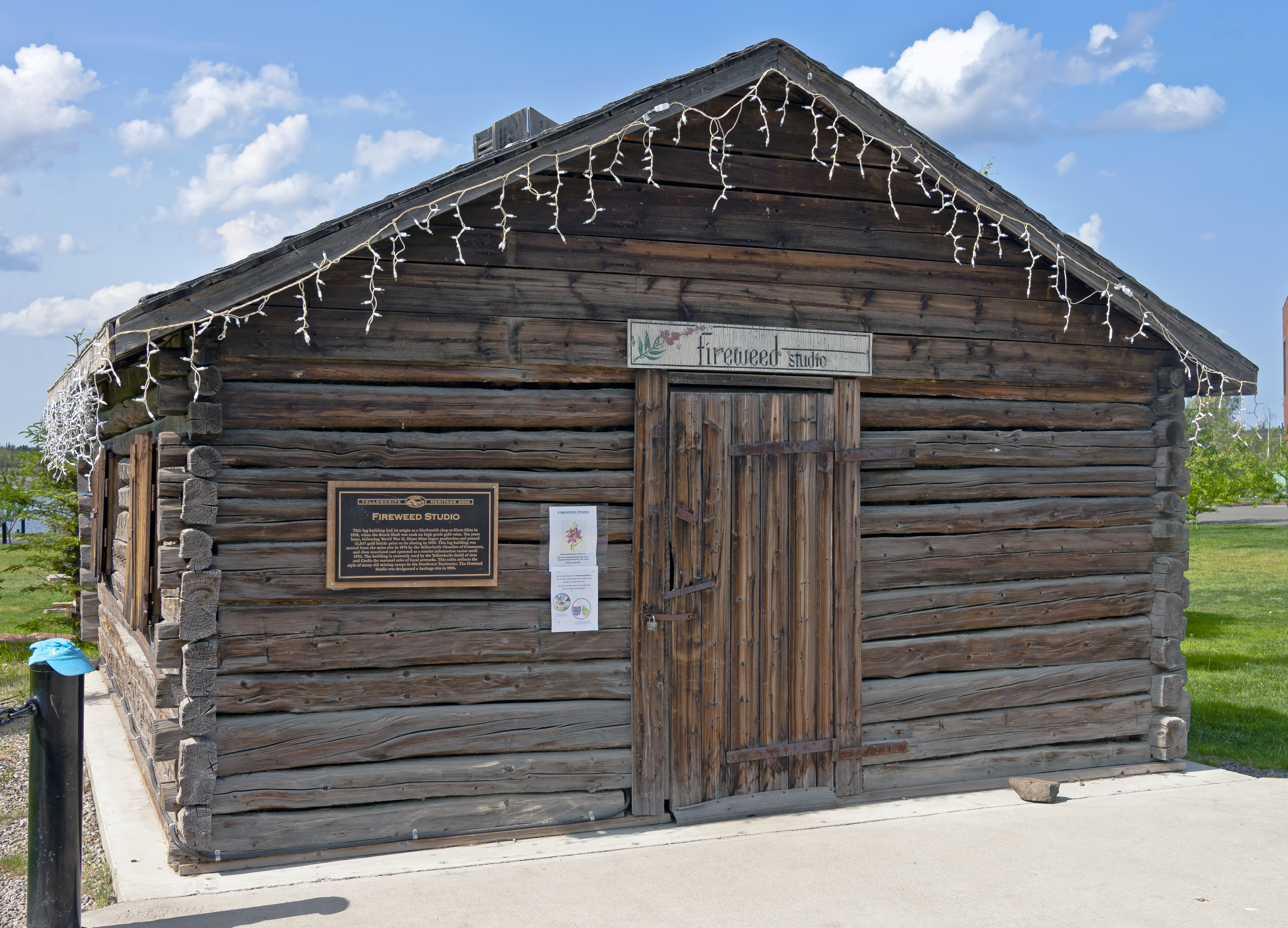
East (front) elevation and south profile, 2015

The Fireweed Studio is a log cabin in Yellowknife, Northwest Territories, Canada, located in Somba K'e Park near City Hall. It was built in the late 1930s to house explosives at what later became Giant Mine, and later moved to its present location. In 1996 it was listed on the Canadian Register of Historic Places; two years later it was designated a city Heritage Building for its status as a well-preserved remnant of the city's early years.

Following its construction, it was used for a year to store explosives. After more modern facilities were built for that purpose, reagents were stored there during the 1940s, as well as other mining supplies. It was sold to the Yellowknife Chamber of Commerce in 1973, and was renovated for use as a tourist center. More recently, after some further renovations, it has served as a gift shop operated by the Yellowknife Guild of Arts and Crafts during summer months.

== Building ==
Fireweed Studio is located along the west side of 49th Avenue between 52nd and 53rd streets, at the eastern edge of the small Somba K'e Park. On the north side of the park is Yellowknife's modern brick city hall. An open expanse of grass to the west descends via a series of terraces with concrete retaining walls to a concrete tiled walkway at the edge of Frame Lake. South is a curved parking lot and wooded parkland. Across the street are residential properties amid parking lots with some mature trees along the edges, buffering the neighbourhood from the denser development and high-rises along Franklin Avenue, the city's main street, a block to the east.

The building itself is a one-storey log cabin slightly rectangular in shape, with a few small trees, mostly white spruce, at the sides and rear. It sits on a concrete foundation and is topped with a front-gabled roof pierced in the centre by a small modern chimney. The logs are stained brown and form saddle joints at the corners.

The other facades

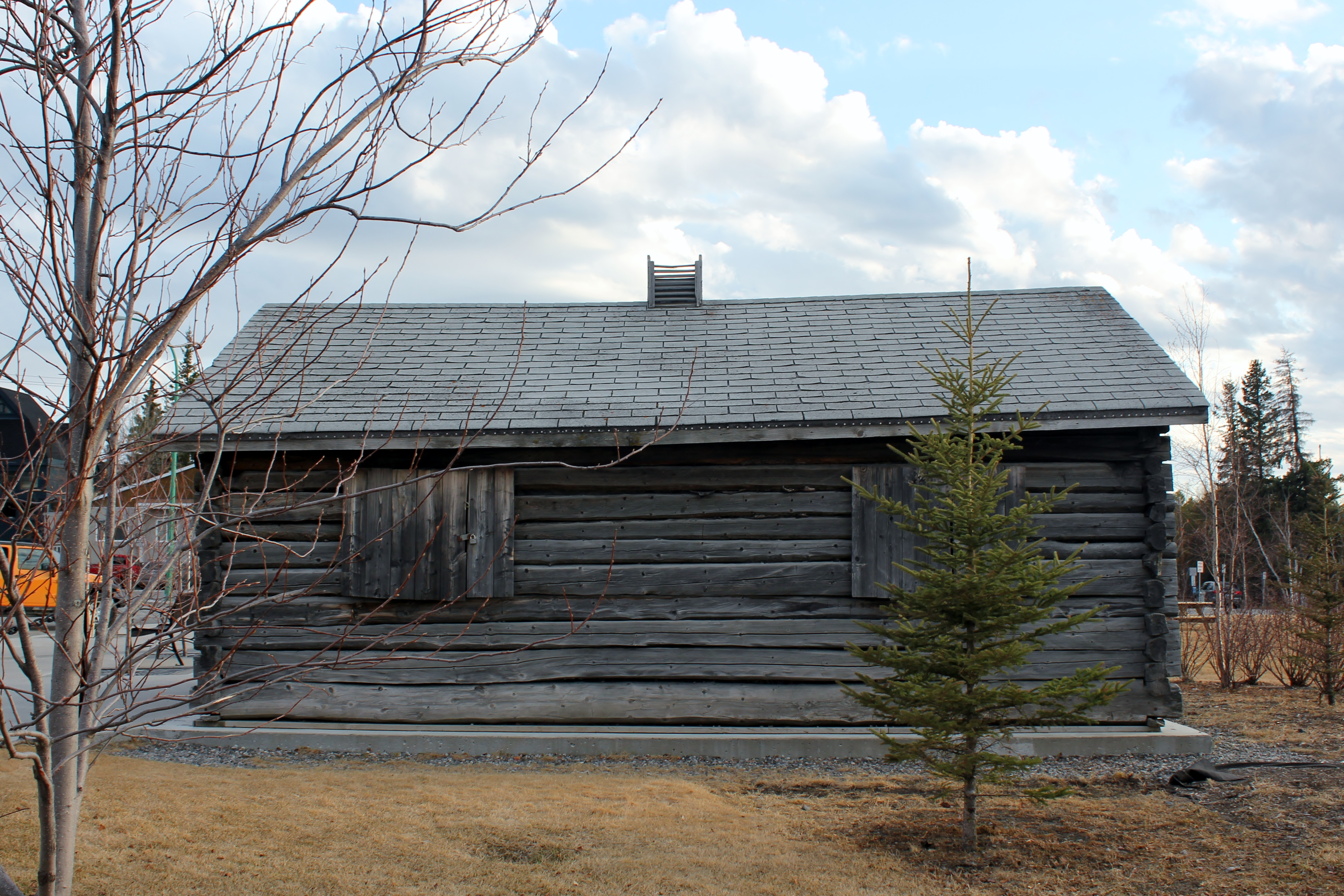
North side

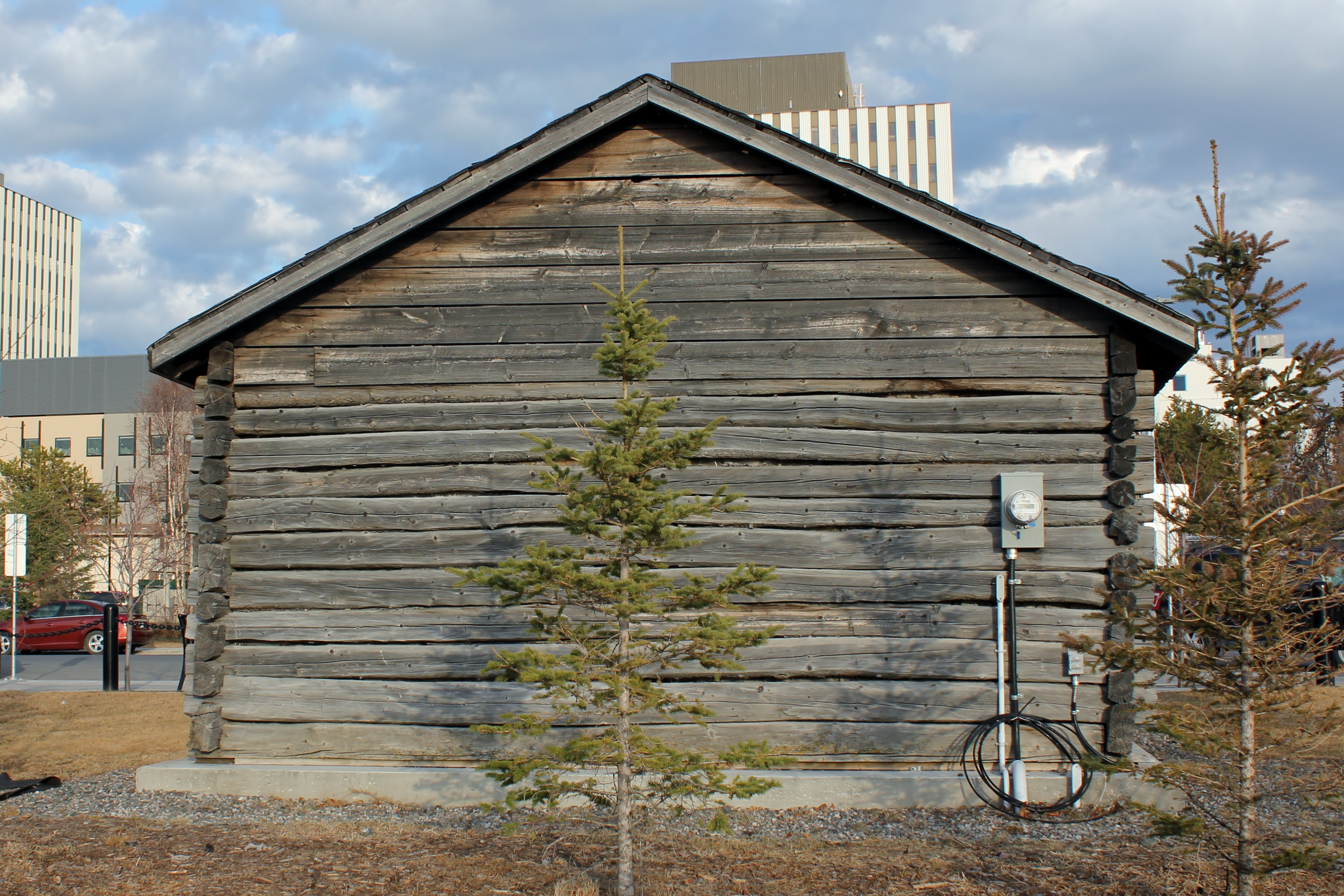
Rear

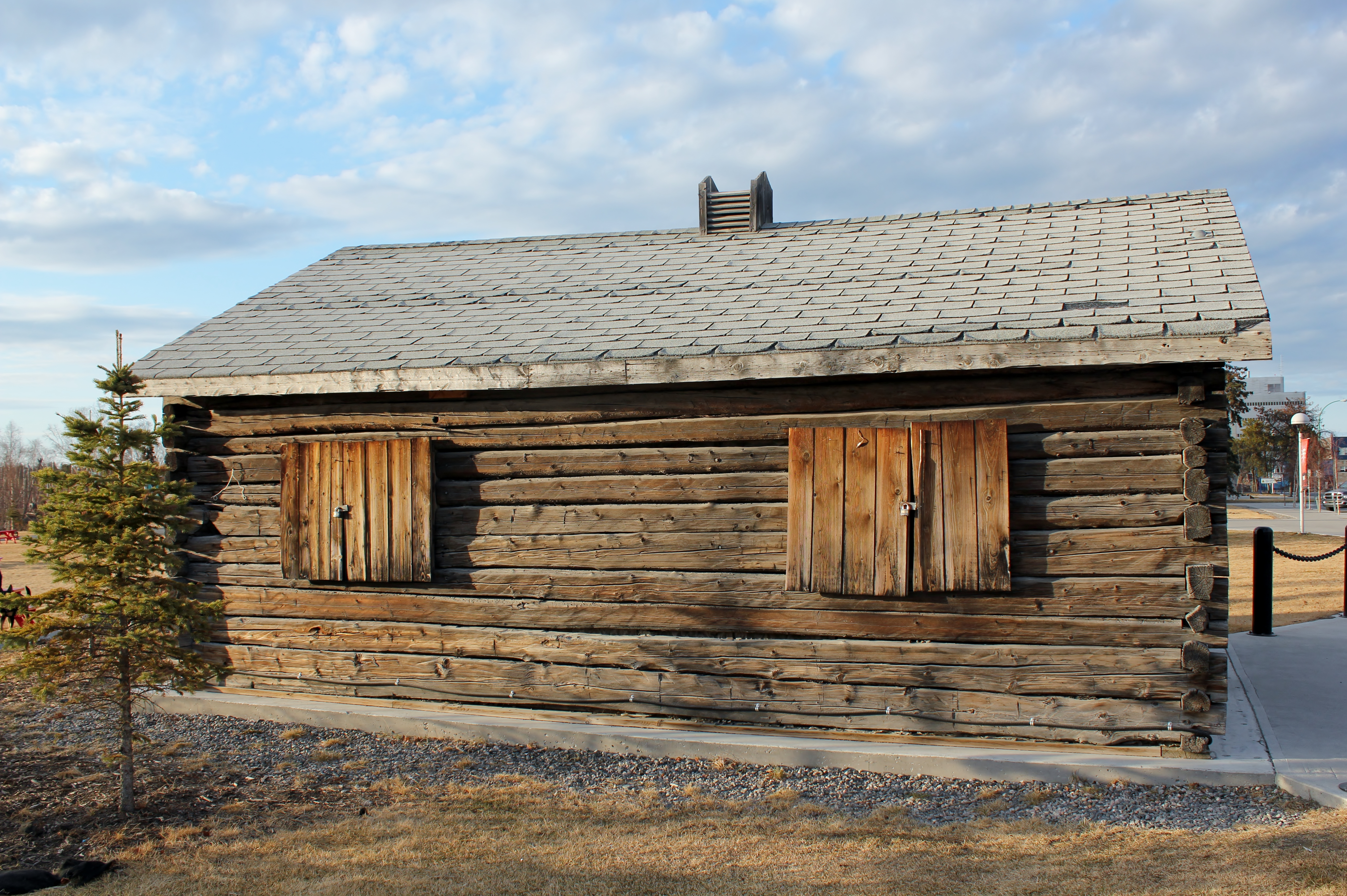
South side

In the middle of the three front bays on the east (front) facade is a door of vertical flushboard in a plain wooden surround, with rusted metal strap hinges; a wooden screen door is behind it. It is the only entrance. A horizontal sign above the lintel says "Fireweed Studio". To its south is an interpretive plaque.

Both sides have windows in the second and fourth of their five bays covered by locked vertical flushboard shutters similar to the door when the building is closed. The rear is completely blind; a modern electric meter is affixed to it near the southern corner. A narrow plain wooden frieze on narrow eaves marks the roofline. The roof itself is covered with asphalt shingles.

== History ==
The cabin was built in 1939 at Giant Mine, north of today's Yellowknife. It is sometimes inaccurately stated, including on the building's interpretive plaque, that it was used as a blacksmith's shop; in reality it was used to store dynamite used during shaft sinking to reach the Brock gold vein. In the following decade more secure bunkers were built closer to the shaft, so the cabin was used instead for storage of other supplies, such as reagents. It continued in that use until 1973, when the mining company sold it to the local Chamber of Commerce for CDN$1, which moved it to very near its present location.

At first, the chamber planned to use it as a tourist information centre. While it did some work toward that end the following year, Yellowknife's city hall was also being built nearby, and the contractor was allowed to store some construction materials in the cabin in exchange for restoring it after the city hall project was complete. However, that storage continued for a year after city hall was finished, and the chamber opened the building in 1976.

The cabin continued to serve as a tourist information centre throughout the 1980s. Some work was done in 1988 to replace drywall and flooring in the interior. Four years later, the city's current tourist centre was built, and the crafts guild, one of Canada's oldest, moved in.

After the tourist centre moved out in 1992, the craft guild took over, opening to the public to sell the works of its member artists on Saturdays and holidays during the summer. In 1998 the city designated it a Heritage Building. It was added to the Canadian Register of Historic Places in 2004. "An attractive, well-kept, nicely weathered building," the Register says, "it has been a continuous part of life in Yellowknife since the 1930s. Today, in its location on City Hall grounds, it is a familiar landmark and symbol of Yellowknife's early years."

Five years later, in 2009, during some landscaping changes in the park, it was moved slightly to its current location where it was put on a newly poured concrete foundation. In 2013, the guild started opening the store on Tuesday nights to take advantage of crowds attending the city's nearby farmer's market. Sales increased briskly enough that the guild decided to extend its summer schedule, staying open on Tuesdays through the last farmer's market of the year, in late September.

== See also ==
- List of historic places in the Northwest Territories
- Log Cabin School, another 1930s log cabin nearby with a city and national heritage designation
