= Bentley Mall =

Shopping mall in Fairbanks, Alaska

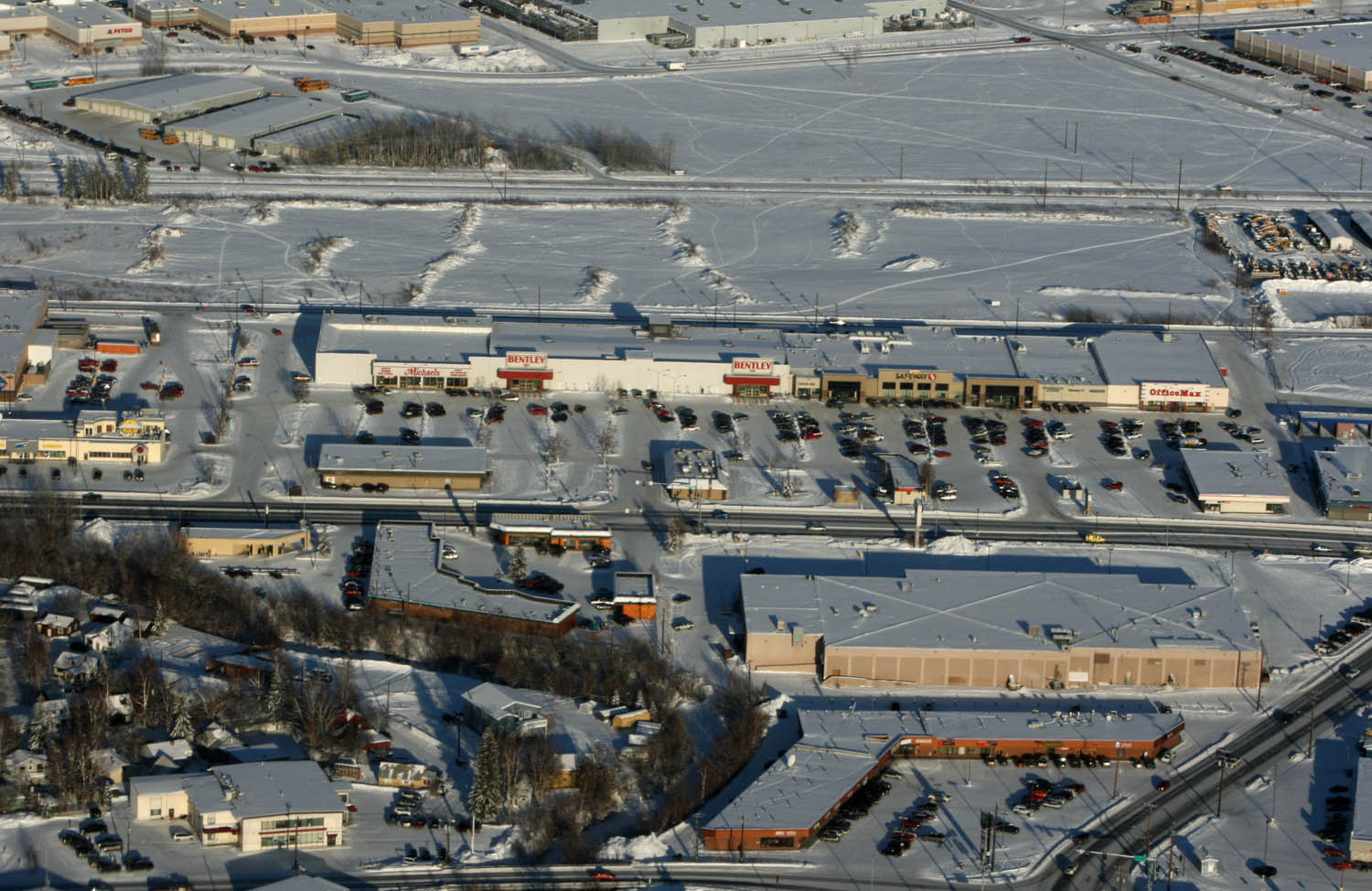
- Bentley Mall, 2009
- Location: Fairbanks, Alaska, United States
- Coordinates: 64°51′07″N 147°42′08″W
- Address: 32 College Road
- Opened: April 1977
- Num. of stores: 27
- Num. of anchor tenants: 3
- Floor area: 170,000 square feet (16,000 m^{2})
- Floors: 1

Bentley Mall is an enclosed community shopping mall located in Fairbanks, Alaska, United States. It is notable as the northernmost mall in both the United States and North America. It is 2 degrees further north latitude-wise than Centre Square Mall, Canada's northernmost mall located in Yellowknife, Northwest Territories, and also north of Nuuk Center in Greenland.

== Background ==
The mall's location was the site of the Bentley Dairy from about 1922 through the 1940s, the centerpiece of the family's land holdings which stretched at one point from the Chena River to the foothills north of Fairbanks along the present-day Farmers Loop Road.

Bobby Miller (born 1916), in partnership with a member of the Bentley family, established the Miller-Bentley Equipment Company in 1953, the same year the Steese Highway was rerouted around the property in conjunction with the opening of the Wendell Street Bridge. A junkyard operated on the site for over two decades.

In 1969, Miller, along with his nephew Cliff Burglin, established the Bentley Family Charitable Trust, as there were no surviving members of the Bentley family and their land had not been disposed of to that point. The trust, which existed into the 21st century, took income from the family properties and distributed it to charities, particularly libraries, stretching from Fairbanks to northern California.

The Miller-Bentley Equipment Company left the site in 1974. Construction of the mall began in 1976, and it opened in April 1977 with Safeway and Pay 'n Save as its anchor tenants. In an unusual move for the lower 48 but not for the city of Fairbanks, Pay 'n Save did not immediately close down its existing Fairbanks store, located two blocks away in the Gavora Mall, when the Bentley Mall opened. Both stores operated for a number of years.

The mall was sold to a California partnership for $12.1 million in 1982.

Sitting on a 15-acre (61,000 m^{2}) site, the mall is approximately 170,000 square feet (16,000 m^{2}) in size. The mall's anchors are Safeway (38,000 square feet) and Michaels (28,000 square feet, opened in 1999 in the former location of a Pay Less Drug Store). The smaller shops cover an additional 49,000 square feet (4,600 m^{2}).

Due in part to its diminutive size as compared to malls elsewhere in the United States, as well as its setup as a single corridor with Safeway and Michael's at the ends, locals sometimes refer to the mall humorously as "Bentley Small" and "Bentley Hall."
