= Hudson's Bay Warehouse =

Coordinates: 62.4670°N 114.3480°W

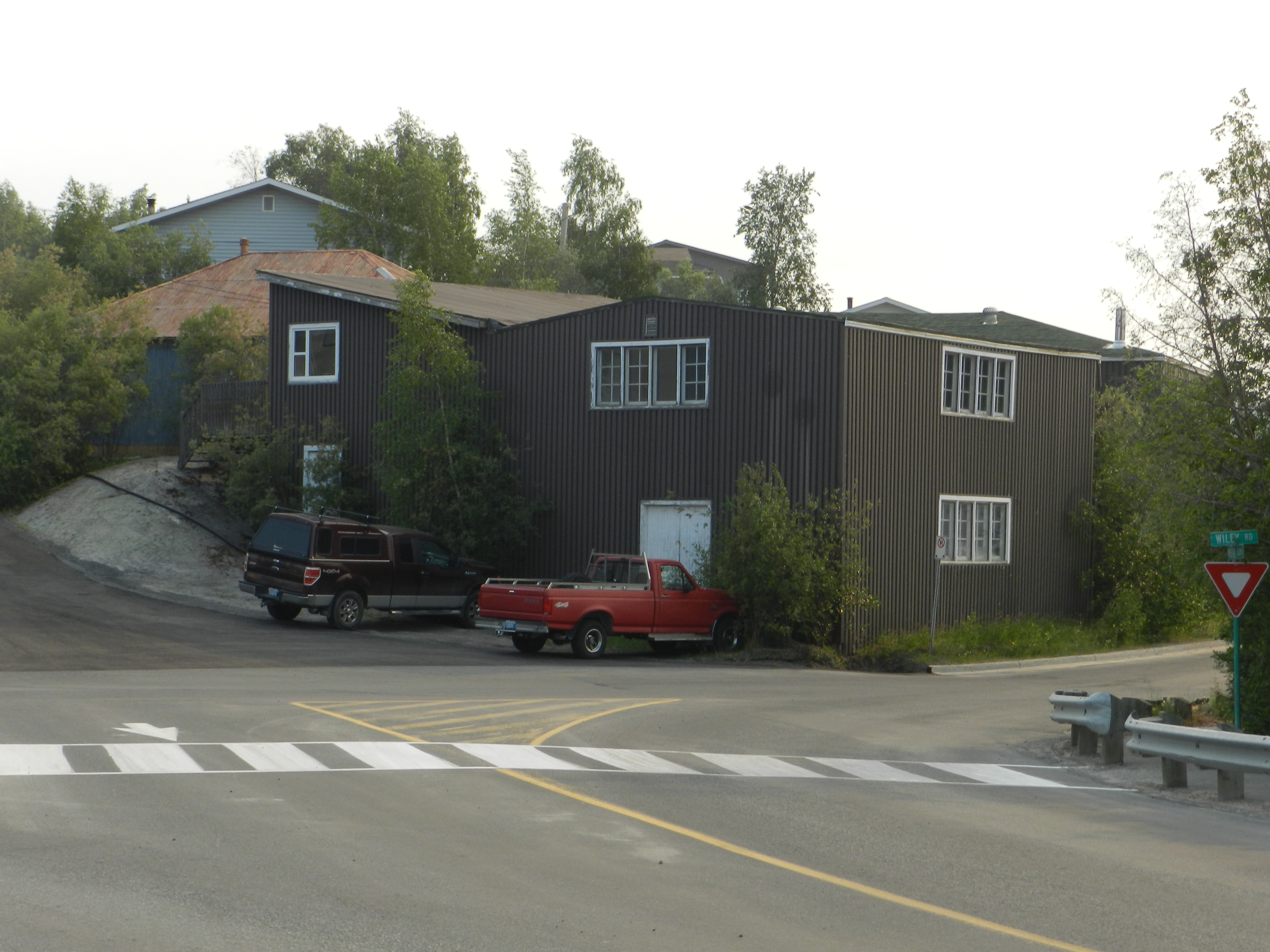
Hudson's Bay Company.

The Hudson's Bay Company began a trading post in Yellowknife, Northwest Territories, Canada in 1938 at the height of the first gold rush in the region. Fire destroyed the original building in January 1945, and the HBC rebuilt and reopened this expanded trading post store and warehouse in November 1945. It served the Old Town waterfront of Yellowknife for several years. The post was primarily designed for prospector's bush orders during the gold boom years. With the opening of a modern downtown department store in 1947, the Old Town post catered almost exclusively to bush orders, fur trappers, commercial fishers, and prospector supplies. The store closed in 1960 when all HBC operations were centralized to the downtown location. Thereafter, the building was used only as a warehouse for HBC retail operations. The Bay retail stores were rebranded as Northern Stores Inc in 1987 and the warehouse was sold to Les Rocher who has owned it ever since.

The Hudson's Bay Company warehouse was designated a City of Yellowknife Heritage Site in 1993.
