= The Wildcat Cafe =

Log cabin in Yellowknife, Canada

Coordinates: 62°27′59.46″N 114°20′56″W

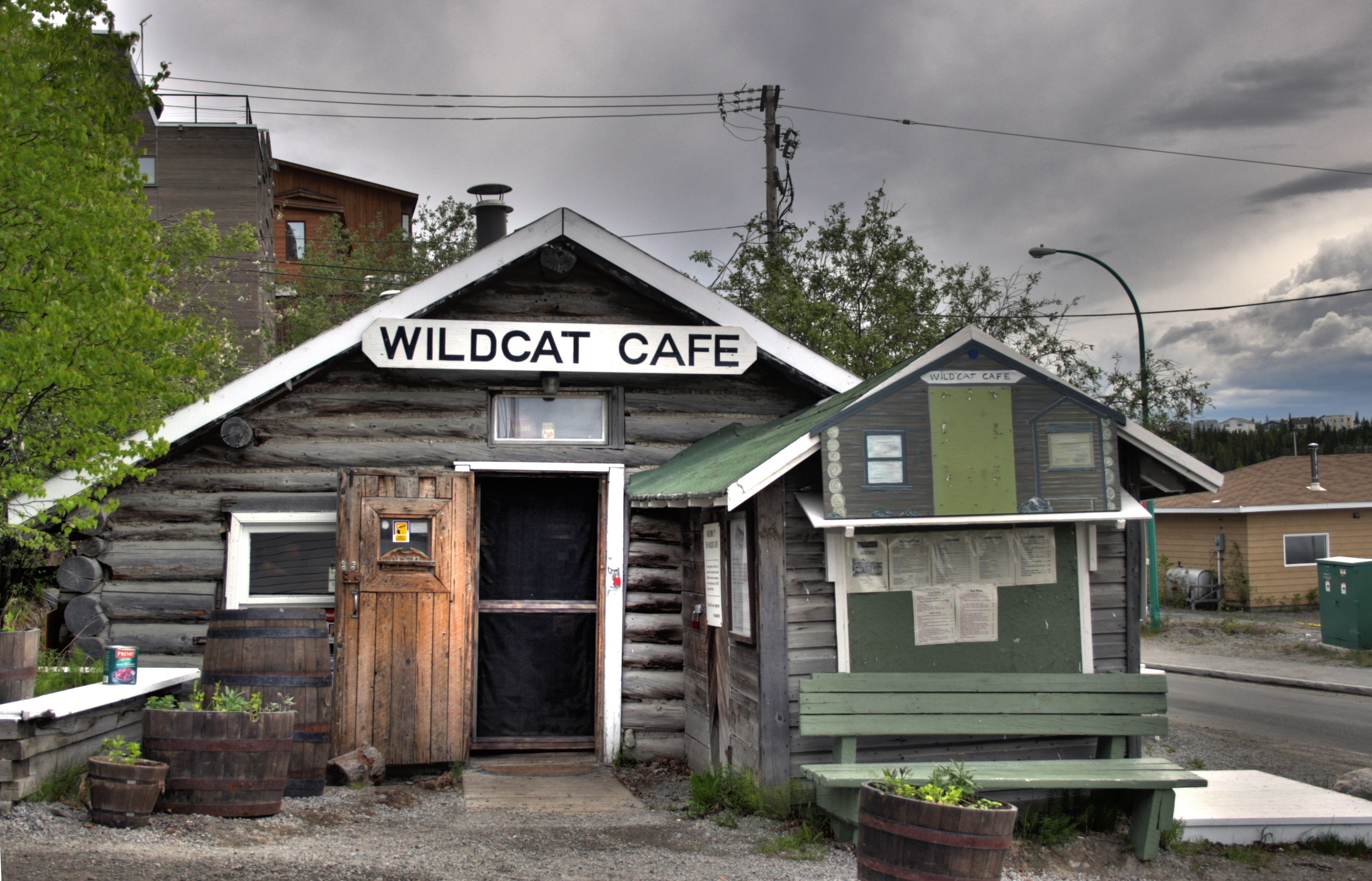
Wildcat Cafe in the Old Town.

The Wildcat Cafe is a vintage log cabin structure in Yellowknife, Northwest Territories, Canada and represents the mining camp style of early Yellowknife. The structure, which houses a summer restaurant, is located in what was then the central business district of the city. It is a City of Yellowknife Heritage Building, designated in 1992. First opened in 1937 by owners Willie Wylie and Smokey Stout, it is the oldest restaurant in Yellowknife. Subsequent owners were Carl and Dorothy Jensen (1939–1942) and Mah Gow (1942–1951), Yellowknife's first recorded Chinese resident. The cafe closed in 1951 with the illness of Mr. Gow. The building was saved from demolition in the late 1950s when a small group of Yellowknifers fought to have it protected as a heritage site. By 1970 no work had been done to restore the abandoned cabin and it was in poor shape when a new generation of concerned citizens lobbied for its protection. It was soon renovated and reopened as a functional restaurant in 1979. The Old Stope Association, a non-profit heritage society, was responsible for its operation in the 1970s–1980s, and today it is managed by the Wildcat Cafe Advisory Committee. In 1992, the cabin was declared a heritage site as an important old building in Yellowknife and the city took ownership. It is one of Yellowknife's most popular tourist attractions.

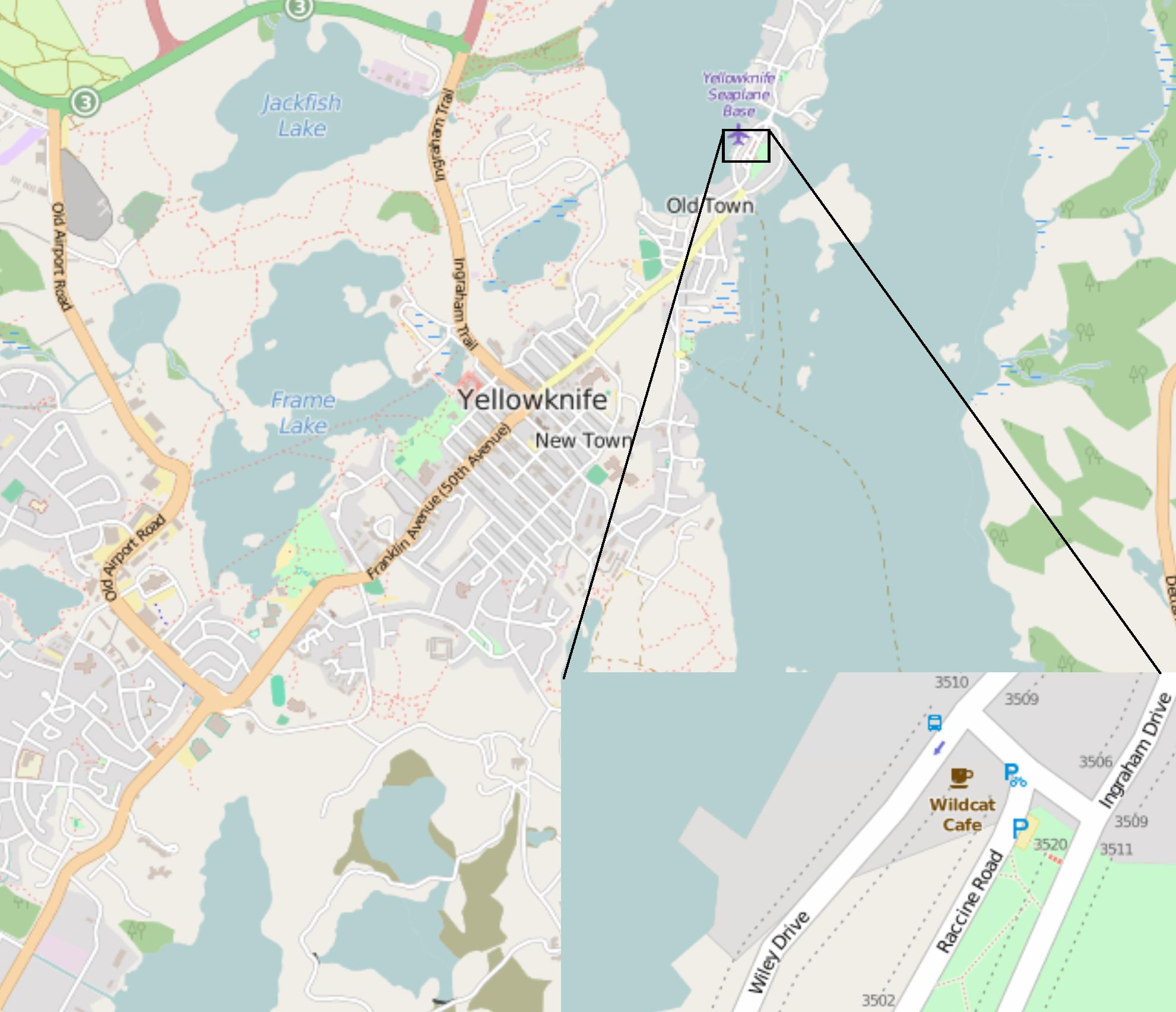
Map of the Wildcat Cafe in Yellowknife

In 2011, the city of Yellowknife decided to completely renovate the log building, which had settled far into the ground and was leaning dangerously in several directions at once. The City engaged Rick Muyres, the premier log cabin builder in the NWT to oversee the rebuild. The dis-assembly process, including cataloguing and numbering the pieces, started on May 11, 2011. Reconstruction and repair continued during the summer of 2012 and the opening was delayed due to a number of unforeseen problems; however, the Wildcat Cafe reopened on June 22, 2013.

The Canadian Museum of History in Gatineau, Quebec, exhibited a replica of the cabin. This replica is being removed as part of a larger renovation to the museum's Canada Hall.
