= Back Bay Cemetery =

Cemetery in Yellowknife, Northwest Territories, Canada

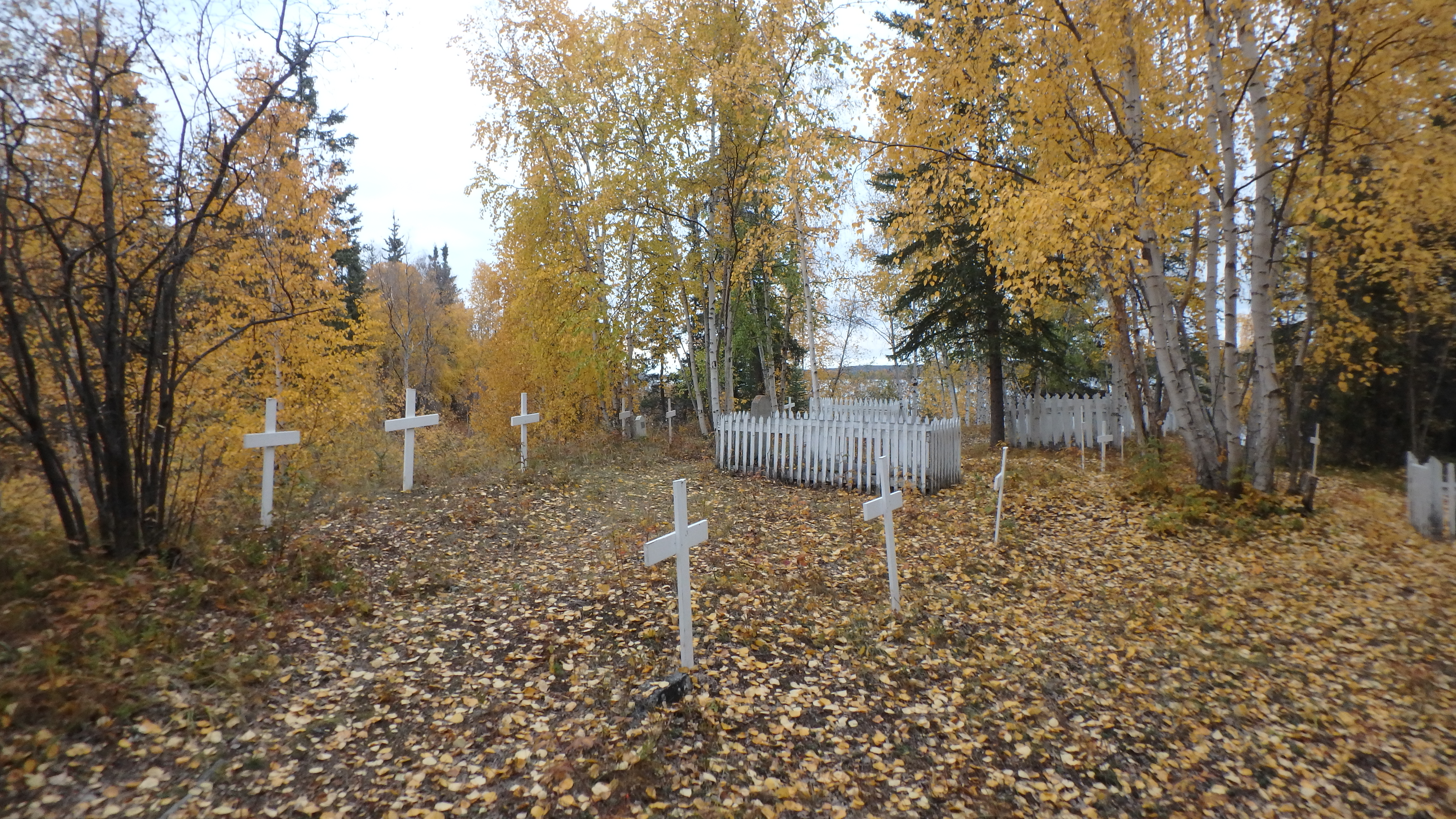
- Interactive map of Back Bay Cemetery

Details
- Location: Yellowknife, Northwest Territories
- Country: Canada
- Coordinates: 62.4691°N 114.3626°W
- No. of graves: ~35
- Find a Grave: Back Bay Cemetery

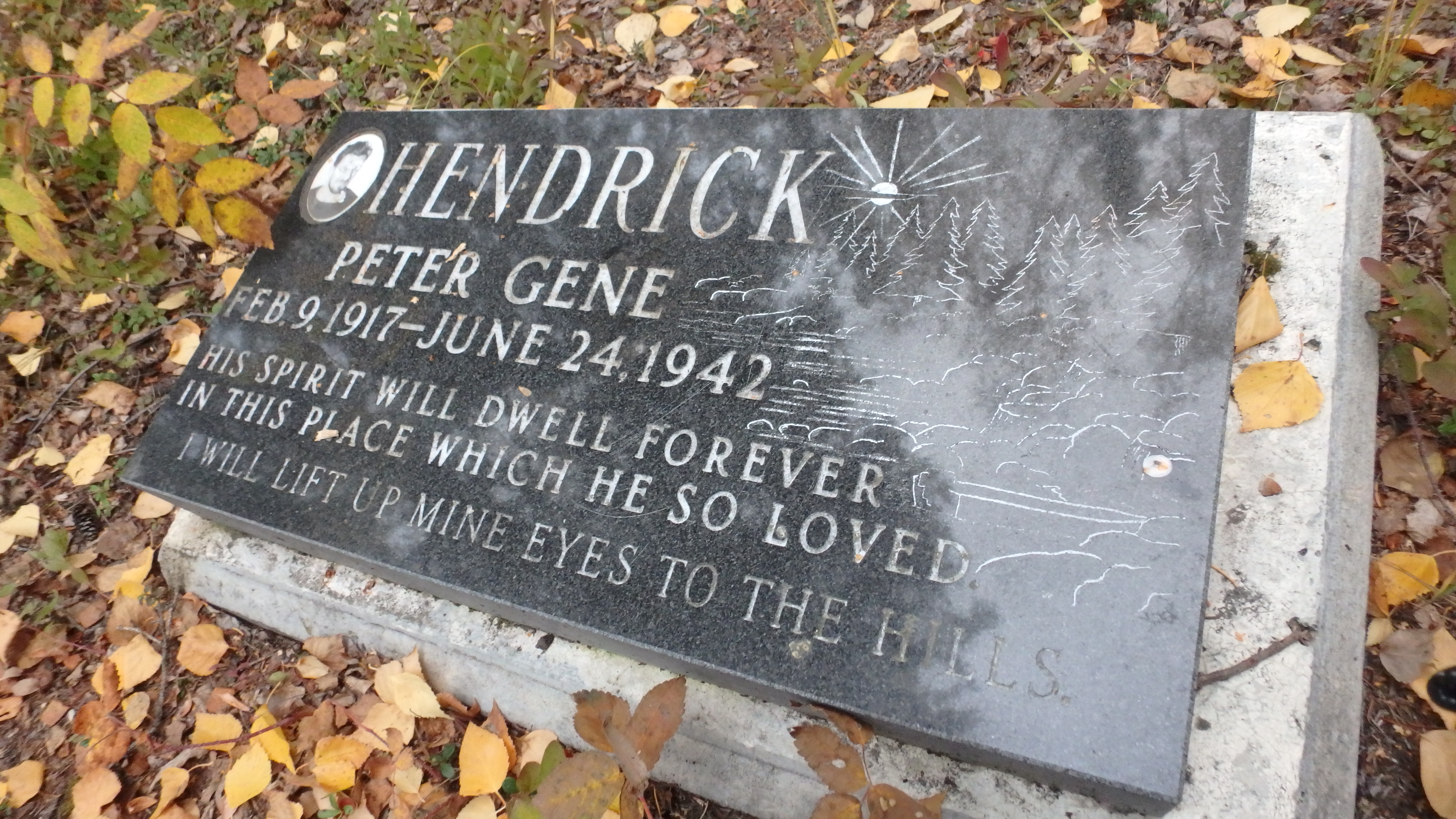
Back Bay Cemetery - Headstone 1942

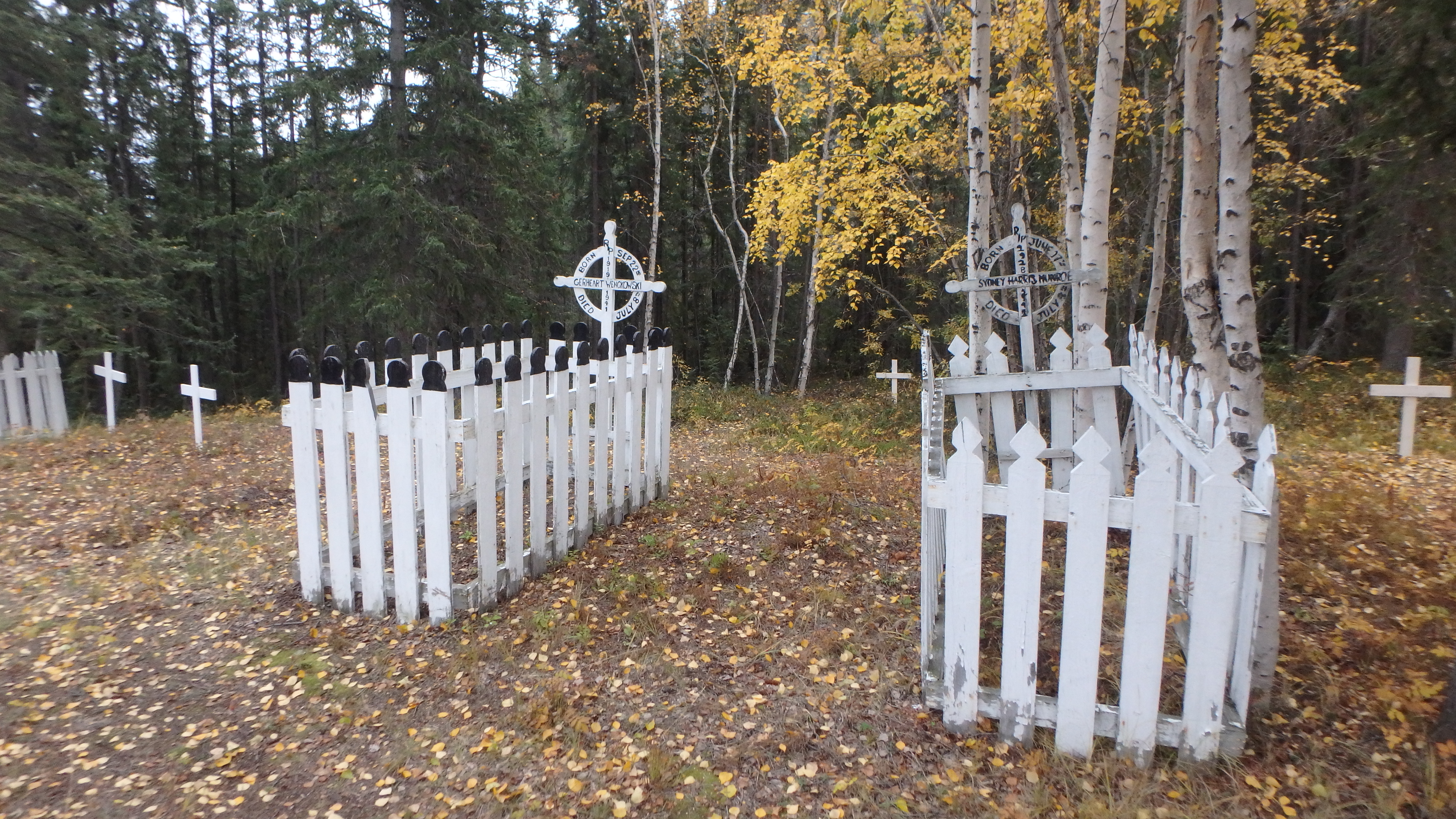
Back Bay Cemetery in the fall

Back Bay Cemetery, the original cemetery in Yellowknife, Northwest Territories, Canada, is located on Back Bay, a section of Yellowknife Bay on Great Slave Lake. The first recorded burial here was on September 27, 1938, following the death of Art McIntyre who committed suicide because of his fear of working underground. Between 1938 and 1946, when the cemetery was closed and relocated, over 40 people were buried here. Continual erosion of a nearby creek bank has damaged and exposed many graves. The site is designated a City of Yellowknife Heritage Site. By late 2014, the site had fallen into even greater disrepair and was in need of proper maintenance.
