= Centre Square Mall =

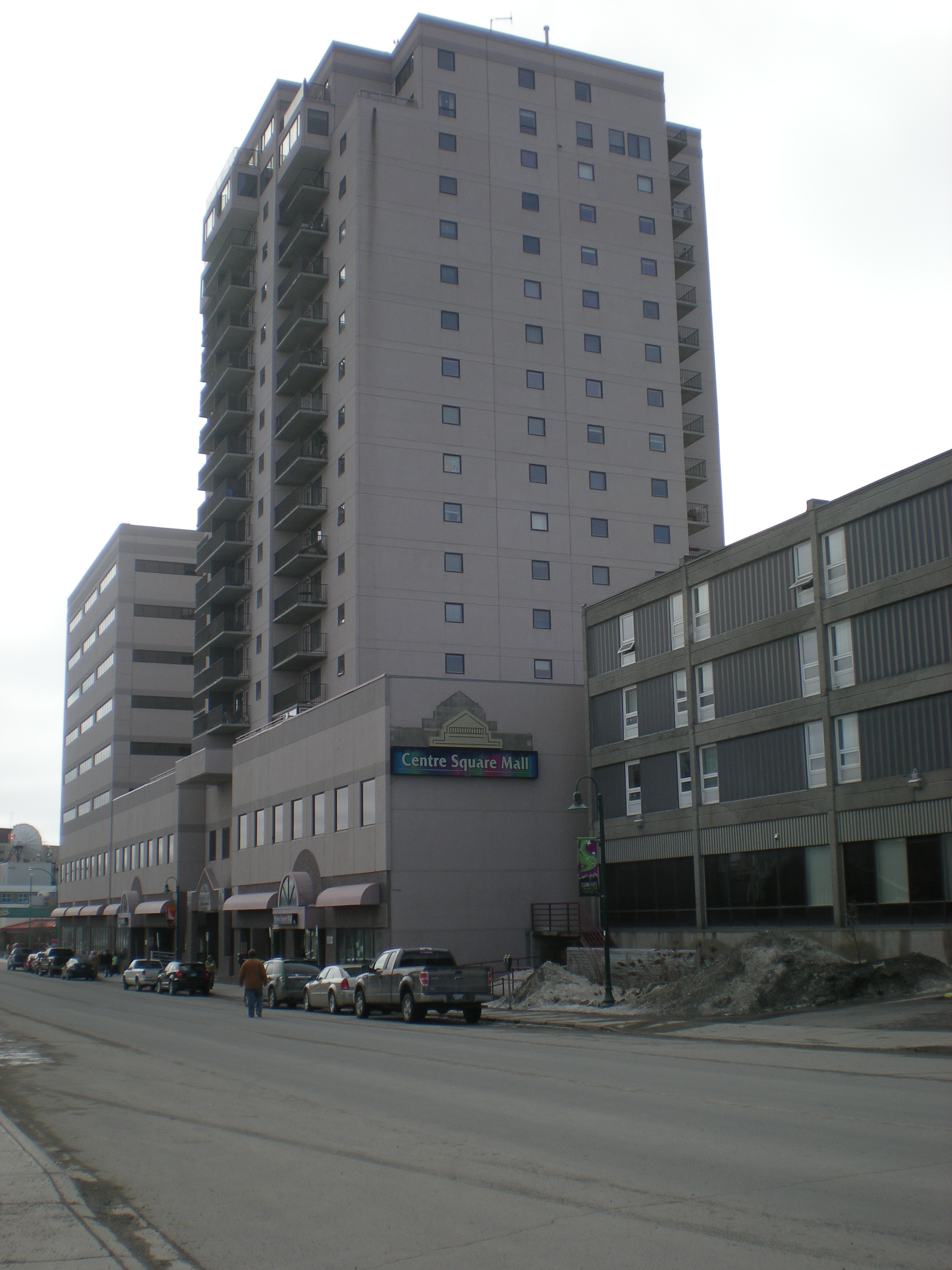
- Centre Square Mall-Northern Heights
- Location: Yellowknife, Northwest Territories, Canada
- Coordinates: 62°27′12″N 114°22′11″W
- Address: 5022 49th Street
- Developer: Clark Builders
- Manager: Nunastar Properties
- Owner: Nunastar Properties
- Num. of stores: 9
- Floors: 17
- Website: centresquare.ca

Centre Square Mall is an enclosed shopping mall in Yellowknife, Northwest Territories, Canada. The mall is noteworthy for being the largest shopping centre in the territory and the tallest building in Northern Canada. The first phase of the mall was opened in August 1990; the expansion of the mall beneath the Yellowknife Inn, now the Quality Inn & Suites, was opened in January 1995.

Although this mall is one of the northernmost malls in North America, Bentley Mall in Fairbanks, Alaska is 2 degrees further north. Centre Square Mall also lies 0.2 km (0.12 mi) south of the YK Centre (62°27′18″N 114°22′13″W), Yellowknife's first mall, making it Canada's second northernmost enclosed mall and the third northernmost enclosed mall in North America.

In July 2025, Nunastar Properties announced it had purchased the mall.

== Overview ==
The mall contains shops, Tim Hortons, government offices, the Workers' Safety and Compensation Commission, the Quality Inn, Northern Heights condominium, Yellowknife Visitor Centre, and the Yellowknife Public Library.

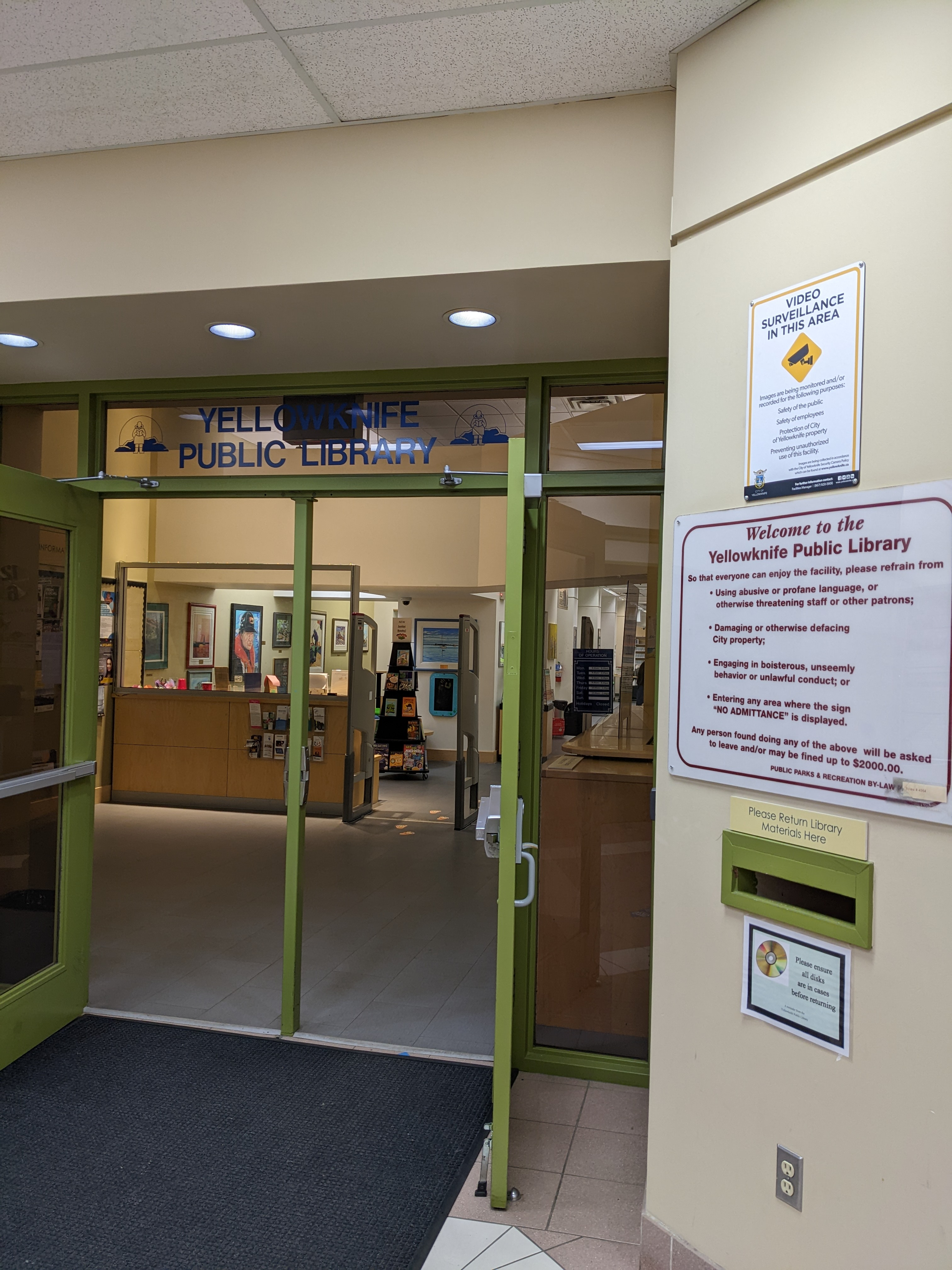
Entrance to Yellowknife Public Library, located at Centre Square Mall.

== See also ==
- List of tallest buildings in Yellowknife
- Azimut Hotel Murmansk - tallest building in the world north of the Arctic Circle and the second tallest building in the world north of 60°N.
