= List of tallest buildings in Yellowknife =

Tall buildings in Yellowknife
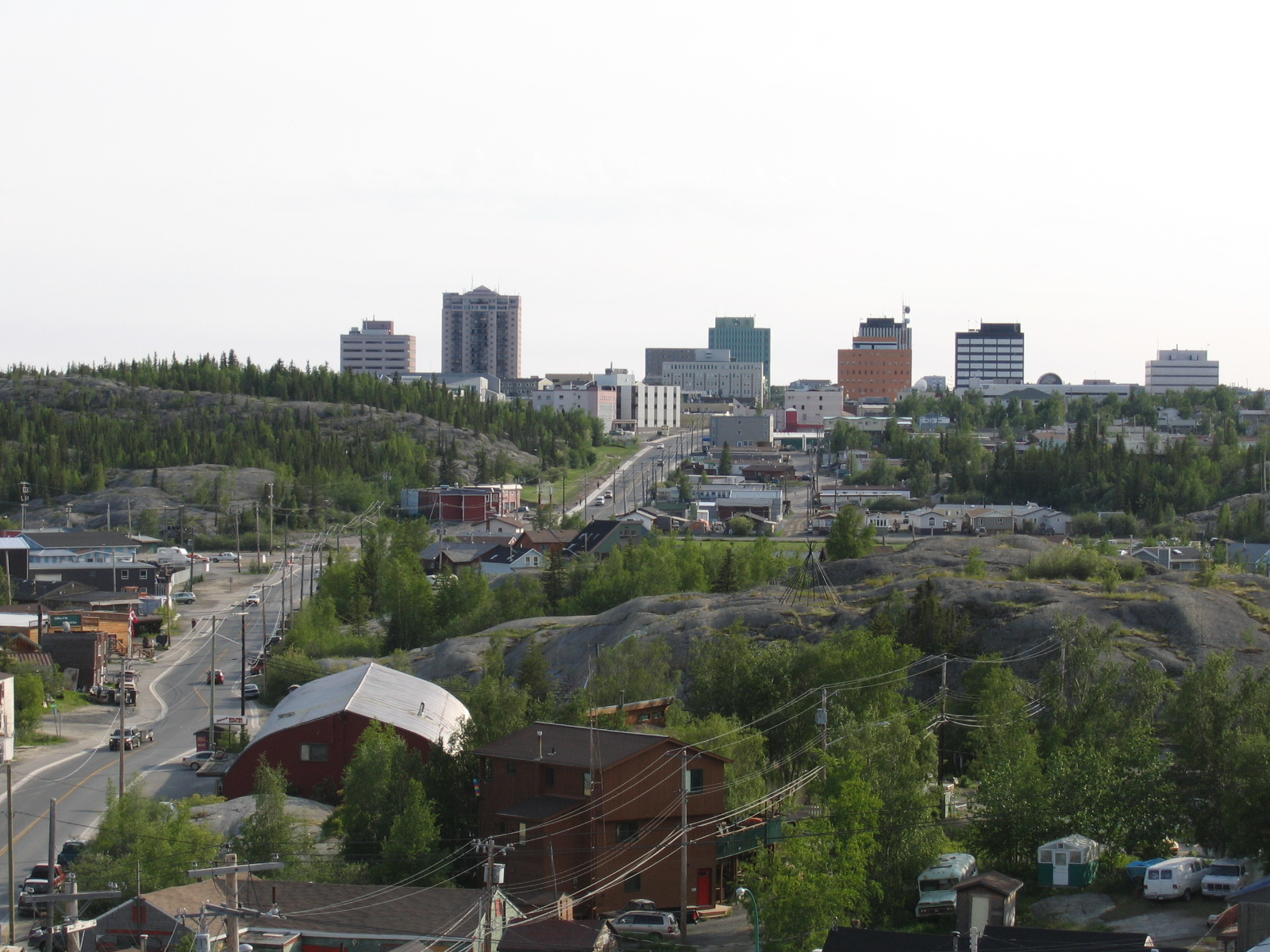
- Downtown Yellowknife
- Tallest building: Centre Square – Northern Heights (1996)
- Tallest building height: 60 m (197 ft)

Number of tall buildings
- 10 stories or more: 9
- Taller than 50 m (164 ft): 3

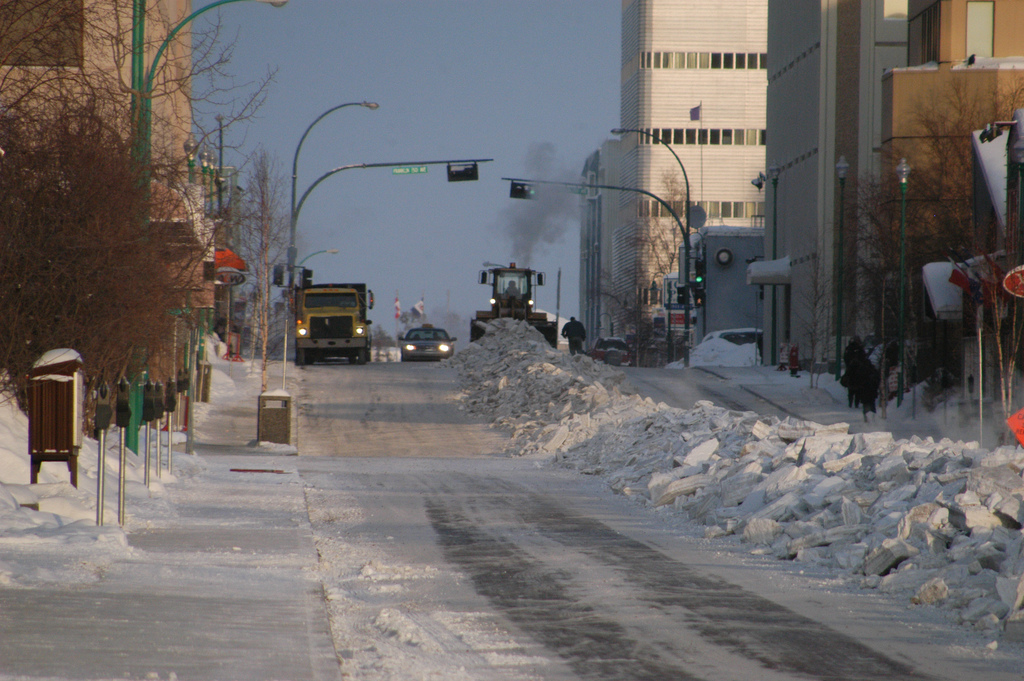
Downtown Yellowknife during the winter months

This list of tallest buildings in Yellowknife ranks skyscrapers over 30 m (98 ft) tall in the city of Yellowknife, Northwest Territories, Canada. Yellowknife is the capital of and largest city in the Northwest Territories and the second largest in Northern Canada. As of 2011, the city contains 3 skyscrapers 50 m (164 ft) and over, with a further 7 high-rise buildings that exceed 30 m (98 ft) in height. The tallest building in the city, and the NWT, is the 17-storey, 60 m (200 ft) Centre Square – Northern Heights. This building was constructed in a postmodernist architectural style, representing the city's efforts to add visual interest into the skyline. The second-tallest building in the city is the Watermark Tower (Polar Apartments), standing at 50 m (164 ft) tall with 15 storeys.

Having a population of almost 20,000 people, Yellowknife has a skyline that is disproportionately large, considering its size, population, and location. This is due to Yellowknife's position in a vast resource-rich area in Northern Canada, a region larger than India. More specifically it is the capital of the Northwest Territories which compose a large part of Northern Canada. Yellowknife is the largest city in the Northwest Territories, and, as such, many large businesses such as diamond-mining and iron-mining consortiums are headquartered or have bases in the city. The city acts as a distribution point for many of these resources. Yellowknife is connected to the southern Canadian city of Edmonton via the Yellowknife and Mackenzie Highways.

== List of tallest buildings ==
This list ranks buildings in Yellowknife that stand at least 30 m (98 ft) tall, based on CTBUH height measurement standards. This includes spires and architectural details but does not include antenna masts.

Rank	Name	Image	Height	Floors	Completed	Notes	Ref
1	Centre Square – Northern Heights ^{map1} (mixed use)		60 m (197 ft)	17	1996	Tallest building in Northern Canada.; Third northernmost enclosed mall in North America.	
2=	Watermark Tower (Polar Apartments) ^{map2} (residential)		50 m (164 ft)	15	2003		
2=	Northwest Tower ^{map3} (office)		50 m (164 ft)	12	1991		
4	Scotia Centre ^{map4} (office)		45 m (148 ft)	11	1979		
5	Fraser Tower ^{map5} (hotel)		42 m (138 ft)	14	1970		
6	Precambrian Building ^{map6} (office)		41 m (135 ft)	11	1976		
7	Anderson – Thomson Tower ^{map7} (residential)		38 m (125 ft)	11	1986		
8	The Nest (formerly the Bellanca Building) ^{map8} (office)		36 m (118 ft)	10	1973		
9	Northern United Place		34.5 m (113 ft)	10	1976		

== Other notable buildings ==
=== Con Mine ===
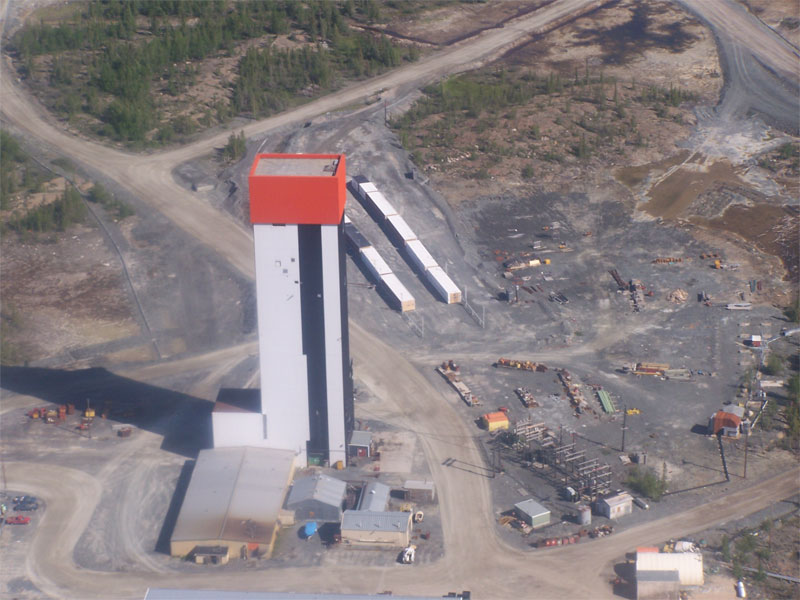
Looking at the Robertson Headframe from above, 2006.

At 76 m (249 ft) the Robertson headframe located at Con Mine was the tallest building in Yellowknife and the Northwest Territories. The headframe which was built in 1977, sat over a mine shaft 1,859 m (6,099 ft) deep. The headframe was demolished on 29 October 2016.

=== Explorer Hotel ===
The Explorer Hotel is located on 49th Avenue in Yellowknife, Northwest Territories, Canada. It is an eight-storey-tall modernist concrete structure built in 1974. Located atop an outcrop overlooking downtown, the hotel is one of the most prominent buildings in the city, and claims to be the largest hotel in Northern Canada; it has also been described as the city's best and grandest. It is owned and operated by Nunastar Properties. The building was expanded in 2008 and 2019.

=== Greenstone Building ===
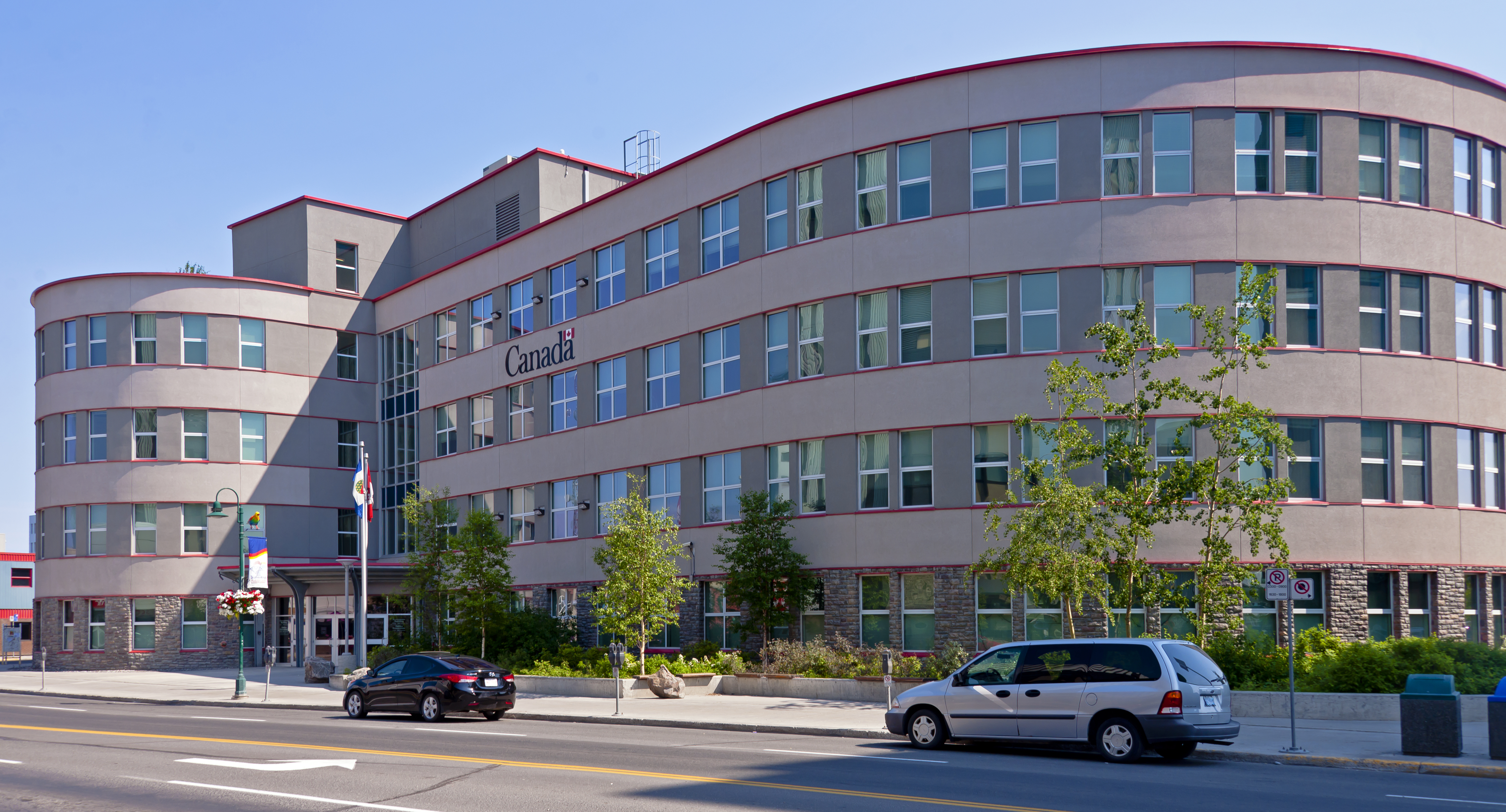
The Greenstone Government of Canada Building

The Greenstone Building on Franklin Avenue downtown houses offices of 16 different federal government agencies. Before its completion in 2005, on time and under budget, those offices had been scattered in different locations. In 2007 it was certified LEED Gold by the Canadian Green Building Council for its environmental sustainability; among other features it generates some of its own electricity through building-integrated photovoltaics. It was the first building in the Canadian North to receive LEED certification of any level.

=== Mackenzie Place ===
Mackenzie Place, known locally as the High Rise, is a 17-storey apartment building located in Hay River on the south side of Great Slave Lake. Although no accurate height is known it is sometimes called the tallest building in the NWT. An estimated height of 57.64 m (189.1 ft) is given for the building that was completed in 1975 and was until the building of Centre Square – Northern Heights in 1996 the tallest building for 20 years. Unlike Yellowknife there are no other buildings in Hay River of any height so it dominates the skyline and is visible from 75 km (47 mi) away. On 19 March 2019, the building was severely damaged by a fire, forcing its residents to move out. As of 2025, the building remains unoccupied, due to public health issues.

=== Northwest Territories Legislative Building ===
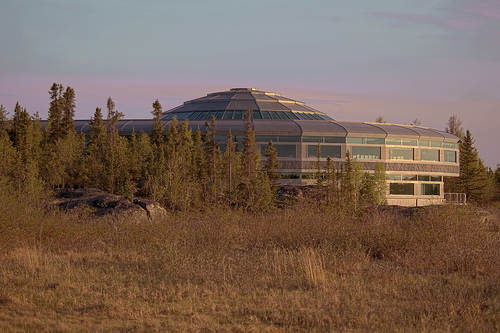
Northwest Territories Legislative Building

The Northwest Territories Legislative Building is the home of the Government of the Northwest Territories. The most recent building was built in 1993 and commenced usage in 1994. The Legislative Assembly has used many permanent and temporary facilities throughout its history.

The current building is two stories tall with two round halls, the Great Hall and the Caucus Room. It is located in Yellowknife, and overlooks Frame Lake. It was designed by Ferguson Simek Clark/Pin Matthews (of Yellowknife) in association with Matsuzaki Wright Architects (of Vancouver), and landscape architect Cornelia Oberlander.

== Timeline of tallest buildings ==
Period	Name	Height	Floors	Completed
1970 – 1979	Fraser Tower ^{map5}	41 m (135 ft)	11	1970
1979 – 1991	Scotia Centre ^{map4}	45 m (148 ft)	11	1979
1991 – 1996	Northwest Tower ^{map3}	50 m (164 ft)	12	1991
1996 – present	Centre Square – Northern Heights ^{map1}	60 m (197 ft)	17	1996

== Nunavut and Yukon ==
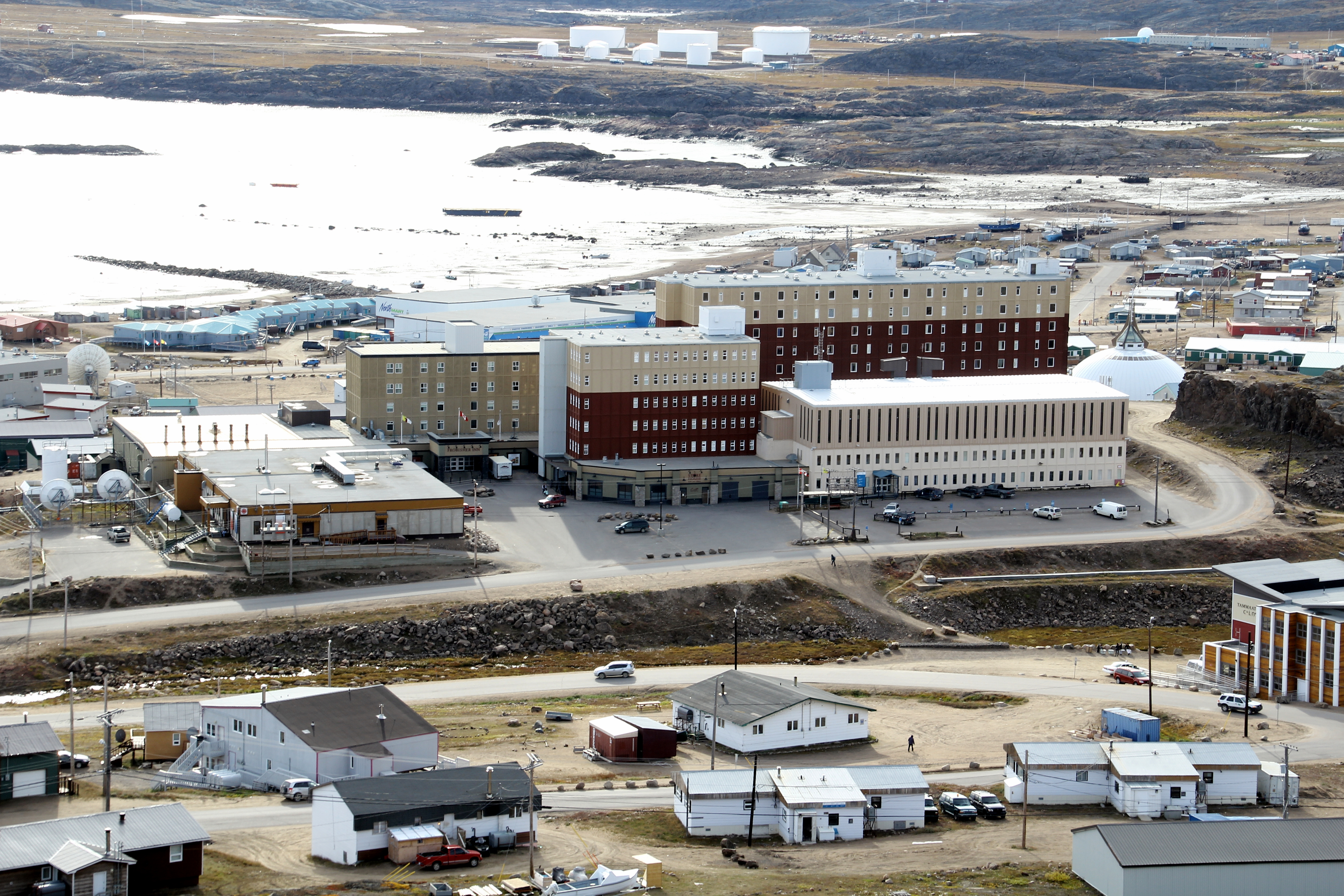
Tukturjuk Tower is the tallest building of the Astro Hill Complex in Iqaluit.

Of the three northern territories, the Northwest Territories is the only one that has buildings over 30 m (98 ft) (or 8 storeys) tall.

The tallest building in Nunavut is the 29 m (95 ft) tall Tukturjuk Tower in Iqaluit.

The tallest building in Yukon is the 20 m (66 ft) tall Mah's Point condos in Whitehorse. The city of Whitehorse had, for many years, a by-law restricting the height of buildings to 20 m (66 ft). The by-law was changed in 2012 allowing for 8 storeys and a height of 25 m (82 ft).

== See also ==
- Architecture of Canada
- List of tallest buildings in Canada

== Maps ==
- ^map1 Centre Square – Northern Heights – 62°27′15″N 114°22′14″W
- ^map2 Watermark Tower (Polar Apartments) – 62°27′15″N 114°21′40″W
- ^map3 Northwest Tower – 62°27′09″N 114°22′27″W
- ^map4 Scotia Centre – 62°27′12″N 114°22′25″W
- ^map5 Fraser Tower – 62°26′57″N 114°21′53″W
- ^map6 Precambrian Building – 62°27′10″N 114°22′30″W
- ^map7 Anderson – Thomson Tower – 62°27′02″N 114°21′48″W
- ^map8 The Nest – 62°27′16″N 114°22′23″W
- ^map9 Northern United Place – 62°27′05″N 114°22′36″W
- ^map10 Explorer Hotel – 62°27′27″N 114°22′22″W
- ^map11 Northwest Territories Legislative Building – 62°27′34″N 114°22′55″W
