= Canadian Pacific Airlines floatbase =

Float base in the Northwest Territories, Canada

Coordinates: 62.4671°N 114.3480°W

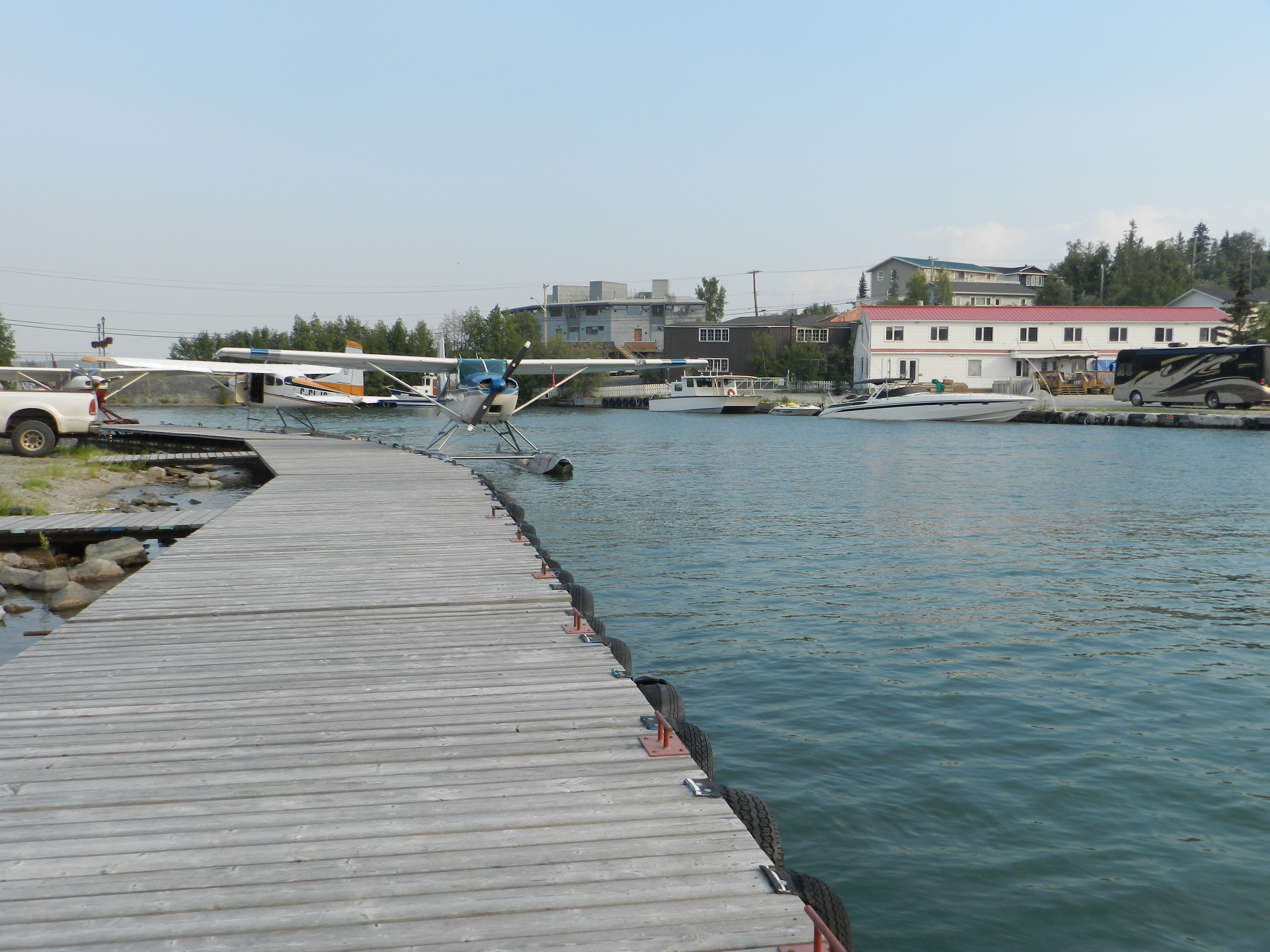
Canadian Pacific Air float base

Canadian Pacific Airlines built this modern float base on the waterfront of Yellowknife, Northwest Territories, Canada, in 1946 to serve as an office, staff housing, and mooring for its fleet of bush planes. Yellowknife was a very active aviation centre during the late 1940s as a result of renewed gold exploration after World War II. The aviation industry however was very tumultuous and many bankruptcies and mergers occurred throughout history, and many airline companies came to use this float base in Yellowknife, including: Canadian Pacific Airlines (1946–1949), Yellowknife Airways (1949–1951), Associated Airways Limited (1951–1956), Pacific Western Airlines (1956–1966), Northward Airlines (1966–1978), and Air Dogrib (1978–1980s).

In more recent years, the old float base was renovated into a micro brewery and pub known as Bush Pilot Brew Pub (1993-1997) and then as a private residence. The CPA float base was designated a City of Yellowknife Heritage Site in 1992.
