= Astro Hill Complex =

Complex of buildings in Iqaluit, Nunavut, Canada

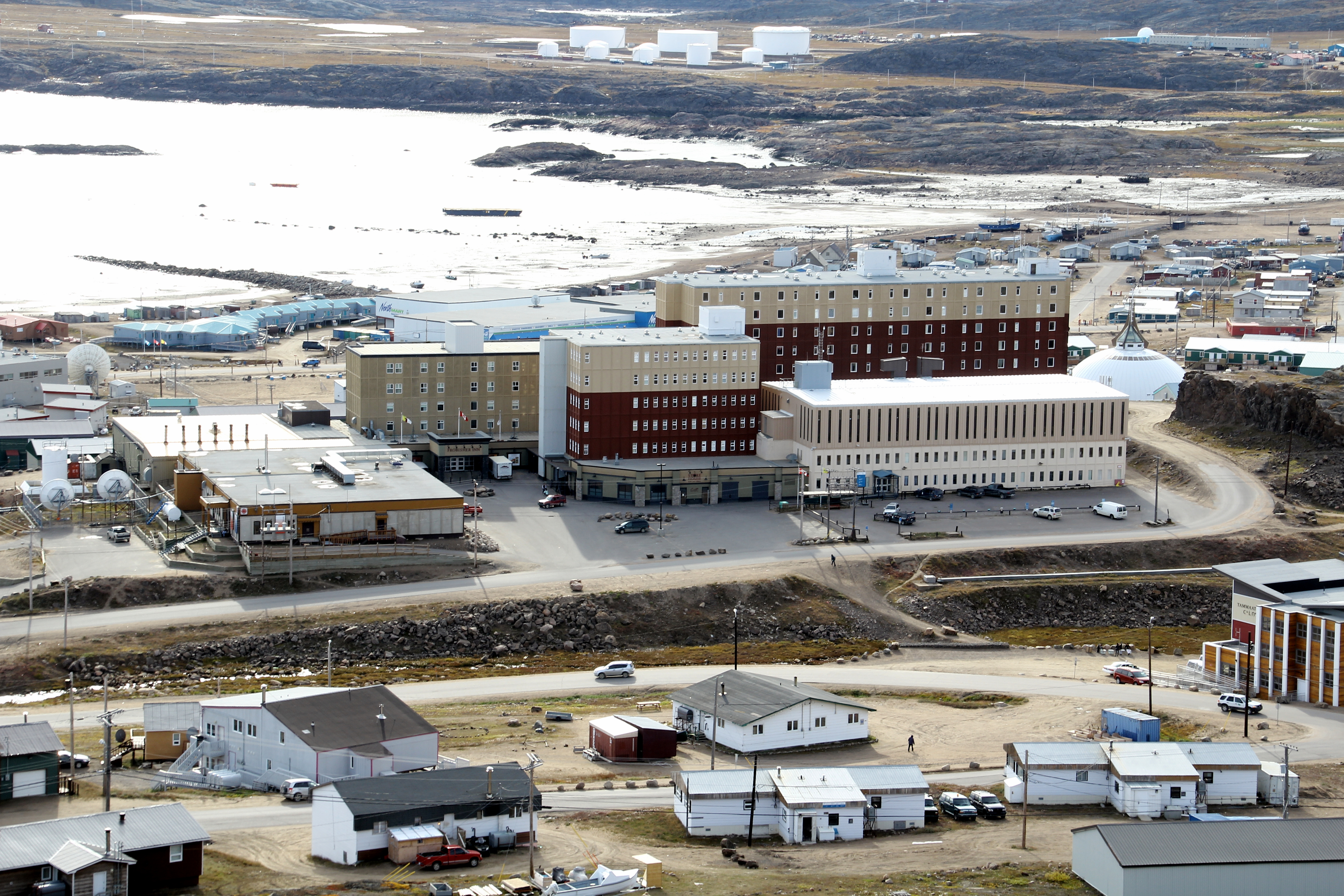
- Astro Hill Complex
- Interactive map of the Astro Hill Complex area

General information
- Status: Completed
- Type: Office/Retail/Residential
- Location: Iqaluit, Nunavut
- Coordinates: 63°44′52″N 68°30′40″W
- Completed: 1976
- Owner: Nunastar

Technical details
- Floor count: 7-8
- Floor area: 12,000-square-foot (1,100 m^{2})

The Astro Hill Complex is a four building structure in Iqaluit, Nunavut, Canada, and includes the W. G. Brown Building, the Frobisher Inn hotel and two apartment buildings. The Astro Hill Complex has the largest and among the tallest buildings in the capital city including the tallest with a floor count of 8.

The Astro Hill Complex houses mixed commercial, government and residential uses. The commercial properties include 10,000 square feet of retail space. Prominent tenants include the CBC North broadcasting studios CFFB, the 95 room Frobisher Inn, the Astro Theater, a conference centre, a fitness centre, convenience store and three restaurants.

The W. G. Brown Building houses numerous Government of Nunavut services such as legal registries, income support, and others. The residential section includes Nanurjuk Tower which is 6 stories tall while Tukturjuk Tower is 8 stories tall. Adjacent to the Astro Hill Complex is "Creekside Village" which includes 144 townhomes and apartments.

== History ==
In 1976, the Astro Hill Terrace was built to overlook Frobisher Bay, which included the Frobisher Inn, a two-story complex that also included shops and various businesses and was renovated in 2004.

In 2011, council rejected a plan to build two more apartment complexes with 118 units in the downtown core behind the Astro Hill Complex.

In October 2012, cracks forced the closure of the Iqaluit swimming pool. According to CBC, the Iqaluit council had approved a recreational facility overhaul by 2013.
