= Fort Reliance, Northwest Territories =

Heritage site in the Northwest Territories, Canada

Coordinates: 62°42′45″N 109°09′53″W

- Great Slave Lake, Northwest Territories, Canada.
- The ruins of Fort Reliance in 1900

Site information
- Type: Winter camp; Trading post
- Controlled by: Hudson's Bay Company

National Historic Site of Canada
- Official name: Fort Reliance National Historic Site of Canada
- Designated: 1953

Site history
- Built: 1833
- Materials: logs

Fort Reliance is the site of a Hudson's Bay Company fort located on the east arm of Great Slave Lake, Northwest Territories, Canada.

== History ==
Fort Reliance was originally built in 1833 by George Back during the Arctic Land Expedition to the Arctic Ocean via the Back River. The expedition, partly scientific and partly searching for the missing John Ross, used Fort Reliance as a winter camp.

Back's fort was made up of a main house with several smaller ones that were constructed from logs. The houses had stone and clay chimneys for heating. The outline of the logs along with the chimneys and some storage pits still exist.

In 1855, the Hudson's Bay Company's Chief Factor James Anderson, for whom the Anderson River is named, rebuilt the fort. It was intended to be used as winter quarters while searching for the lost expedition of John Franklin, but it was again abandoned after one season.

It was not a fur trading outpost although the site was later used by trappers in the Thelon River area. In 1897, a log cabin, using one of the chimneys, was built by an American trapper, Buffalo Jones.

Fort Reliance was designated a National Historic Site in 1953. It is described by Parks Canada as the "oldest continuously operating Hudson's Bay Company post, 1833". Together with the Prince of Wales Northern Heritage Centre, Parks Canada is working to preserve and protect the site, which has resulted in the chimneys being rehabilitated. In 2010, the same property was designated “Old Fort Reliance Territorial Historic Site."

The site lies within Thaidene Nene National Park Reserve. If that proposed national park is ever realized, Fort Reliance National Historic Site would also join the national park system as a separate unit.

== Climate ==
Climate data for Fort Reliance
Month	Jan	Feb	Mar	Apr	May	Jun	Jul	Aug	Sep	Oct	Nov	Dec	Year
Record high °C (°F)	2.1 (35.8)	6.1 (43.0)	8.6 (47.5)	16.1 (61.0)	26.1 (79.0)	29.4 (84.9)	34.3 (93.7)	30.0 (86.0)	27.2 (81.0)	17.9 (64.2)	6.7 (44.1)	4.1 (39.4)	34.3 (93.7)
Mean daily maximum °C (°F)	−23.5 (−10.3)	−21.0 (−5.8)	−14.9 (5.2)	−2.5 (27.5)	7.9 (46.2)	15.6 (60.1)	19.2 (66.6)	16.8 (62.2)	9.6 (49.3)	0.8 (33.4)	−10.9 (12.4)	−20.4 (−4.7)	−2.0 (28.4)
Daily mean °C (°F)	−28.1 (−18.6)	−26.1 (−15.0)	−21.0 (−5.8)	−8.6 (16.5)	2.5 (36.5)	9.9 (49.8)	14.3 (57.7)	12.9 (55.2)	6.5 (43.7)	−2.0 (28.4)	−14.6 (5.7)	−24.4 (−11.9)	−6.6 (20.1)
Mean daily minimum °C (°F)	−32.7 (−26.9)	−31.1 (−24.0)	−27.0 (−16.6)	−14.6 (5.7)	−2.9 (26.8)	4.2 (39.6)	9.3 (48.7)	8.9 (48.0)	3.4 (38.1)	−4.8 (23.4)	−18.2 (−0.8)	−28.4 (−19.1)	−11.2 (11.8)
Record low °C (°F)	−53.5 (−64.3)	−51.2 (−60.2)	−50.0 (−58.0)	−41.1 (−42.0)	−31.1 (−24.0)	−7.2 (19.0)	−1.1 (30.0)	0.0 (32.0)	−7.8 (18.0)	−23.3 (−9.9)	−43.3 (−45.9)	−45.7 (−50.3)	−53.5 (−64.3)
Average precipitation mm (inches)	11.0 (0.43)	9.9 (0.39)	9.6 (0.38)	14.5 (0.57)	19.2 (0.76)	30.5 (1.20)	33.2 (1.31)	50.0 (1.97)	32.2 (1.27)	28.5 (1.12)	19.7 (0.78)	13.7 (0.54)	271.9 (10.70)
Source: Environment Canada

== Demographics ==
Federal census population history of Reliance
Year	Pop.	±%
1976	9	—
1981	15	+66.7%
1986	11	−26.7%
1991	10	−9.1%
1996	2	−80.0%
2001	0	−100.0%
2006	10	—
2011	5	−50.0%
2016	0	−100.0%
2021	0	0.00%
Source: Statistics Canada

In the 2021 Census of Population conducted by Statistics Canada, Reliance had a population of 0 living in 0 of its 1 total private dwellings, no change from its 2016 population of 0. With a land area of 21 km^{2} (8.1 sq mi), it had a population density of 0.0/km^{2} (0.0/sq mi) in 2021.
