= Church of Our Lady of Good Hope =

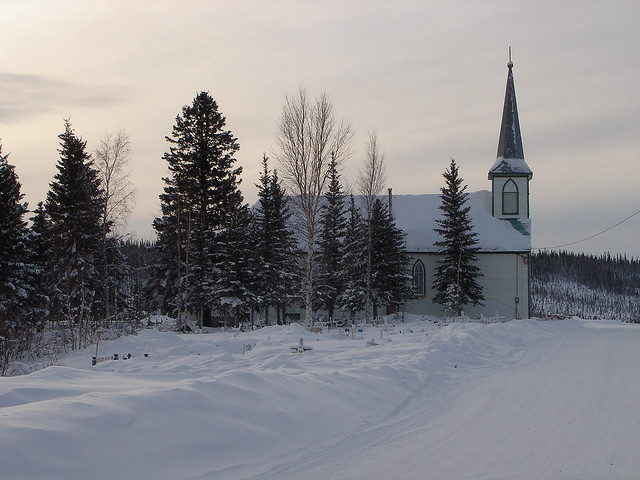
- Church of Our Lady of Good Hope
- 66.2519°N 128.6439°W
- Country: Canada
- Denomination: Roman Catholic
- Website: Listing at Diocesan website

History
- Status: Mission
- Founded: 1864
- Dedication: Our Lady of Good Hope

Architecture
- Functional status: Active
- Heritage designation: National Historic Site of Canada
- Designated: 1977
- Architectural type: Carpenter Gothic
- Groundbreaking: 1865
- Completed: 1885

Specifications
- Length: 45 feet (14 m)
- Width: 25 feet (7.6 m)
- Materials: Wooden frame

Administration
- Archdiocese: Grouard-McLennan
- Diocese: Mackenzie-Fort Smith

National Historic Site of Canada
- Official name: Church of Our Lady of Good Hope National Historic Site of Canada
- Designated: 1977

The Church of Our Lady of Good Hope (French: Église Notre-Dame-de-Bonne-Espérance) is an historic Carpenter Gothic-style Roman Catholic church building located on a bluff overlooking the Mackenzie River in Fort Good Hope, Northwest Territories, Canada. Only 45 by 25 feet (13.7 by 7.6 m) in size, it was built between 1865 and 1885 as a mission of the Oblate Fathers. Father Émile Petitot, "renowned ethnologist, linguist and geographer of the Canadian northwest" was a resident of the mission from 1864 to 1878.

The building's simple exterior, with its wooden siding, steep pitched roof, lancet windows and lancet entranceway under a steepled bell tower, make it a rather plain example of Carpenter Gothic style architecture, which belies the extraordinary painted decoration of its interior.

The Church of Our Lady of Good Hope was designated a National Historic Site of Canada on June 6, 1977. The designation does not include the historic cemetery located to the left of the church building.

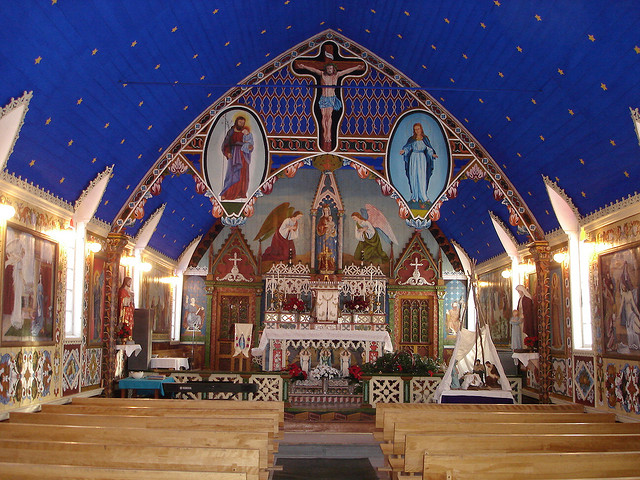
Church of Our Lady of Good Hope - interior

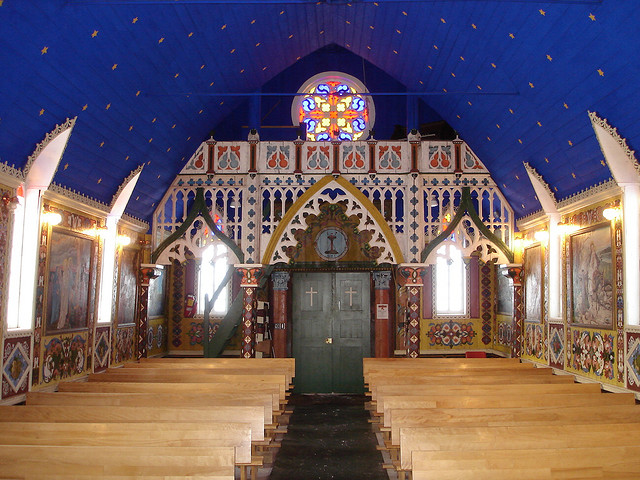
Church of Our Lady of Good Hope - rear interior
