= Bulldog (disambiguation) =

Bulldog may refer to any of the following:

== Dogs ==
The Bulldog is a medium-size breed of dog; the term may refer to any of several Bulldog breeds:

- Bulldog, also known as the English Bulldog, or British Bulldog
- Old English Bulldog, a now extinct breed
- French Bulldog
- American Bulldog, is a breed of utility dog descended from the Old English Bulldog.

== Places ==
- Bulldog Crossing, Illinois, an unincorporated community, United States
- Bulldog Track, also known as the Bulldog-Wau road, a foot track in Papua New Guinea
- The Bulldog, an Amsterdam cannabis coffee shop

== Military ==
- HMS Bulldog, seven different vessels of the British Royal Navy
- Operation Bulldog (disambiguation), four military operations
- Bristol Bulldog, a 1920s British fighter aircraft
- M41 Walker Bulldog, a US Army light tank
- Scottish Aviation Bulldog, a 1970s British training aircraft
- Bulldog, a version of the British Army's FV432 armoured personnel carrier

== Vehicles ==
- Lanz Bulldog, a German tractor manufactured from 1921 to 1960
- Aston Martin Bulldog, a 1979 Aston Martin concept car
- BJJR Bulldog, a British autogyro design

== Sports ==
- Bull Dog (horse), a French Thoroughbred racehorse
- Bulldog, a popular name and mascot for sports teams and other organizations: see list of bulldog mascots
- Bulldog, a professional wrestling throw attacking the opponent's face. The move is also commonly used in steer wrestling.
- British bulldog (game), a tag-based playground and sporting game
- The British Bulldogs, former English professional wrestling tag-team

== Computing ==
- Bulldog (Microsoft), a Master Data Management (MDM) product from Microsoft
- Bulldog Communications, a UK Internet service provider
- Bulldog, a 1980s computer game label owned by Mastertronic
- The Unicode Bulldog Award

== Entertainment ==
=== Music ===
- Bulldog (band), an Argentinian punk rock band
- Bulldog, a 1970s American band featuring Gene Cornish and Dino Danelli, formerly of The Rascals
- 'Bulldog', a song by Tracy Bonham from The Burdens of Being Upright

=== Film and television ===
- 'Bulldog' (The Killing), a television episode
- 'Bulldog', an episode of Thomas & Friends
- Bob 'Bulldog' Briscoe, a character in the US sitcom Frasier
- Bulldog Drummond, a British fictional detective created by 'Sapper' (H. C. McNeile)
- Bulldog Films, a brand name used by film pioneer Will Barker

== Nicknames ==
- Bulldog (Oxford University), a common nickname for constables of the former Oxford University Police
- GWR 3300 Class, a type of GWR 4-4-0 steam locomotive, used on passenger trains
- Bulldog, a synonym for a tractor in Germany (especially in the Munich area), derived from the Lanz Bulldog tractor
- Art Donovan (1924-2013), American Hall-of-Fame National Football League player
- Ray Drummond (born 1946), American jazz musician and teacher nicknamed 'Bulldog' after the detective
- Orel Hershiser (born 1958), American retired Major League Baseball pitcher
- Chris "Bulldog" Parker (born 1964), American radio personality from Buffalo, New York
- Corey Pavin (born 1959), American professional golfer
- Bulldog Turner (1919-1998), American former National Football League player
- Bulldog Bob Brown (1938–1997), Canadian former professional wrestler

== Other uses ==
- Bulldog, former newsletter of the British National Front
- Bulldog clip, a piece of office stationery used to temporarily bind together sheets of paper or card
- Bulldog edition, a newspaper term for the first edition of the day
- Bulldogs, a type of removable cattle nose ring
- Bulldogs forceps, a medical clamp
- British Bulldog or British Bull Dog, a revolver by Webley & Scott (later P. Webley & Son)
- Charter Arms Bulldog, a revolver by American gun manufacturer Charter Arms
- Fresno Bulldogs, an American criminal street gang
