= Explorer Hotel =

Prominent hotel in Yellowknife, Canada

- Hotel logo

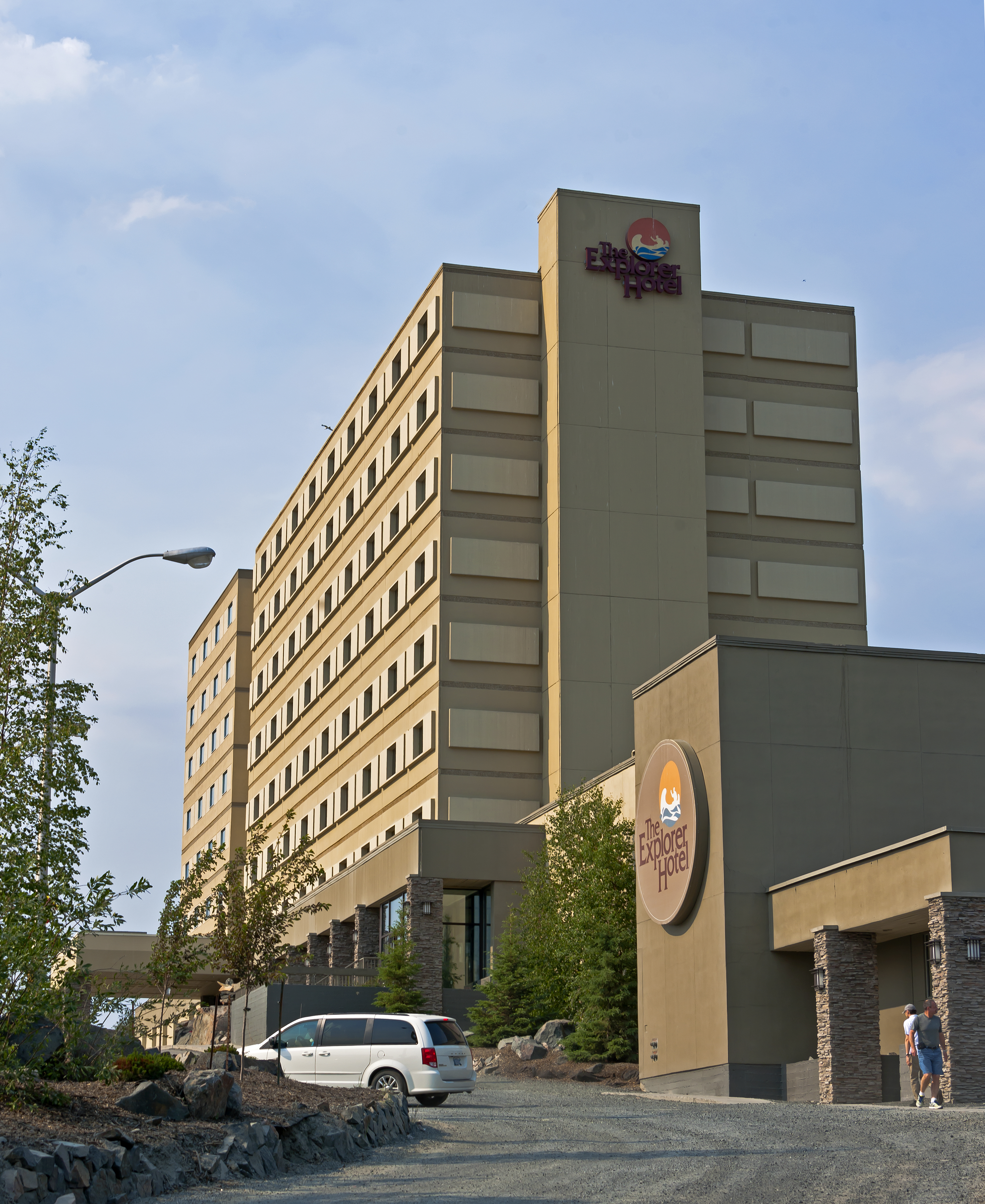
- South elevation and east façade, 2015

- Location within Canada

General information
- Type: Hotel
- Location: 4825 49th Avenue; Yellowknife, Northwest Territories; X1A 2R3
- Coordinates: 62.45738°N 114.37240°W
- Elevation: 200 metres (660 ft)
- Groundbreaking: 1974
- Completed: 1976
- Opened: 1974
- Renovated: 2008
- Owner: Nunastar Properties

Height
- Height: 30 metres (98 ft)

Technical details
- Material: Steel, concrete
- Floor count: 8
- Floor area: 2,360 square metres (25,400 sq ft)
- Lifts/elevators: 2

Renovating team
- Renovating firm: Clark Builders

Other information
- Number of rooms: 187
- Number of restaurants: 2
- Number of bars: 1

Website
- www.explorerhotel.ca

The Explorer Hotel is located on 49th Avenue in Yellowknife, Northwest Territories, Canada. It is an eight-storey-tall modernist concrete structure built in the mid-1970s. Located on a high outcrop of ground overlooking downtown, it is one of the tallest buildings in the city, and claims to be the largest hotel in Northern Canada; it has also been described as the city's best and grandest. It is owned and operated by Nunastar Properties.

Members of three generations of the Canadian Royal Family—Queen Elizabeth II and Prince Philip, Prince Charles, and Prince William and his wife Catherine, Duchess of Cambridge—have stayed at the Explorer on their visits to Yellowknife; it is also a popular destination for tourists who come to the city to see the northern lights. Before the territory's Legislative Assembly had its own building, it often met in the hotel's conference rooms. It underwent renovations in the 1990s, a small expansion in 2008, and in late 2015 the city granted permits for a larger expansion, even as a competing hotel project has been planned for a neighbouring property.

== Building and grounds ==
The Explorer is located at the northwestern edge of the area of downtown Yellowknife known as New Town, the city's main business district, at the intersection of 48th Street and 49th Avenue. It is on a sharp rise in the land, at an elevation of 200 metres (660 ft). On its south and east are developed urban streets in a grid pattern; two blocks to the southeast, at the junction of 48th street and 50th (Franklin) Avenue is the YK Centre, a high-rise that is home to Canada's northernmost enclosed shopping mall. Two blocks to the southwest is the headquarters of the Canadian military's Joint Task Force (North).

On the north and west the land is much less developed. A patch of taiga with outcrops of bedrock, typical terrain for Yellowknife and its surroundings, is to the north. On its northwest a bluff descends to a cleared lot awaiting the construction of another hotel and a wetland that gives way to Niven Lake to the north, with a newer residential area beyond. Across 48th is the territorial visitors' centre, with the entrance roads of the Prince of Wales Northern Heritage Centre and Northwest Territories Legislative Building to their west, set amongst more taiga, and Frame Lake to the south.

A paved driveway leads north into an unpaved parking lot from 49th. On a slope at the north end of the lot stands 2.4-metre-tall (8 ft) inuksuk. The driveway continues through a large paved porte-cochère to a smaller northern parking lot on higher ground.

=== Exterior ===
The hotel building itself is an eight-storey unadorned rectangular 4-by-14-bay concrete-faced structure with a flat roof. The main entrance is located under the porte-cochère on the west (front) elevation. A two-storey wing projects from the south end. There is also a one-storey wing at ground level on the east. In the middle the top of the elevator shaft creates the appearance of two wings.

On the upper stories, all bays of the west façade are set with fixed windows in the centre of a plain panel on a slight projecting portico. The panels and windows of the southern eight bays themselves project slightly; a single narrow projecting panel is located just north of the eighth bay. The ninth bay is recessed almost to the building face; its windows are located on the south end of a flush panel. On the four bays to the south the windows are again centred but the panels are flush. A plain dark course divides all the storeys.

The north face is completely blind. On its western side is a projecting section with some openings for mechanicals at ground level and a large illuminated sign with the hotel's logo at the top. The eastern side has two flush panels, a narrow central one and regular-width one at the east.

On the east the treatment is mostly similar to the opposite façade. However, all bays project and the window is centred in each. There is a corresponding recess between the eighth and ninth bays but it is much narrower. The south façade, also blind, has two normal-width panels at each corner and a shorter one in the centre where a plain staircase tower rises.

==== Additional views ====
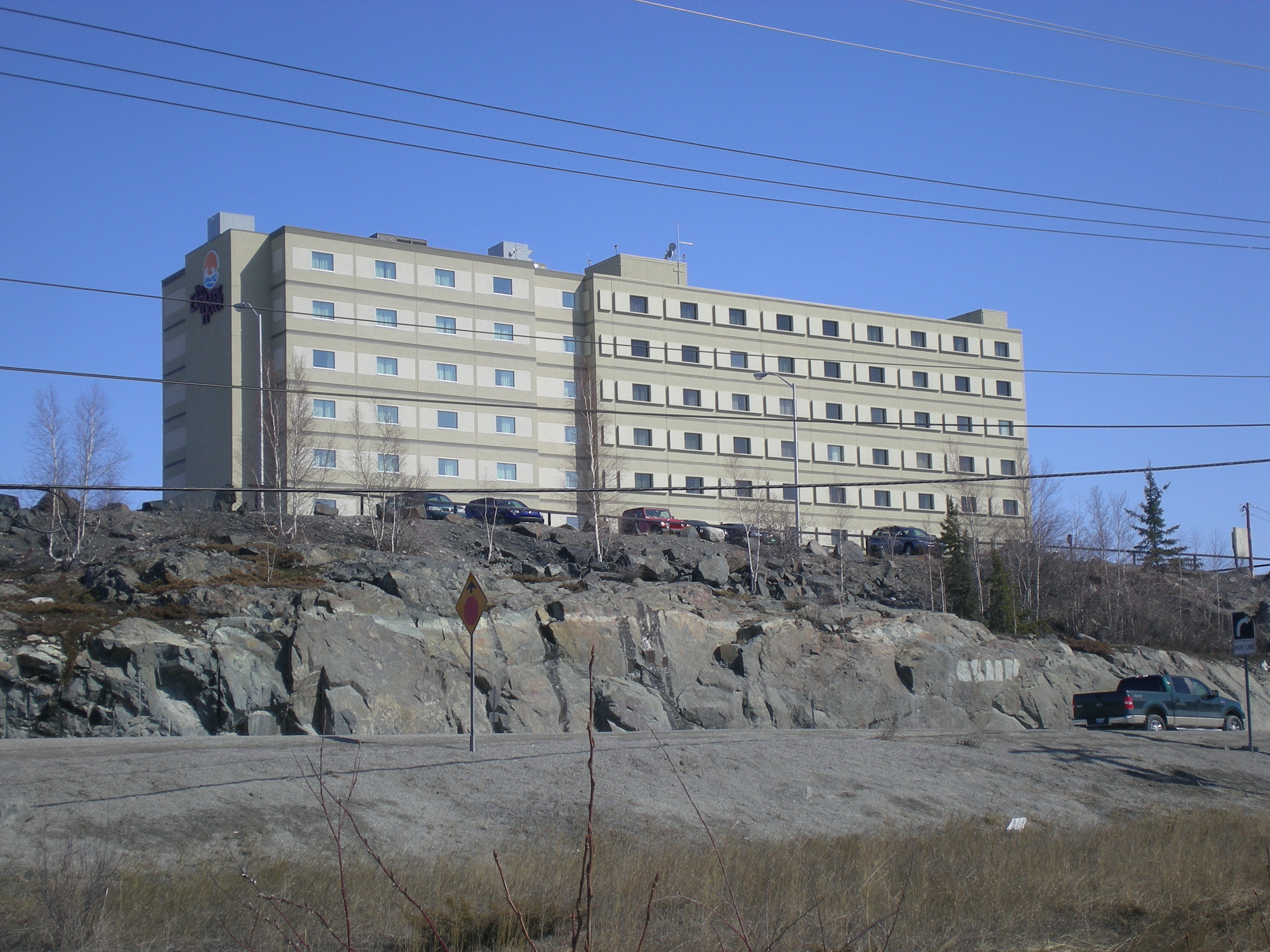
Front view, from west

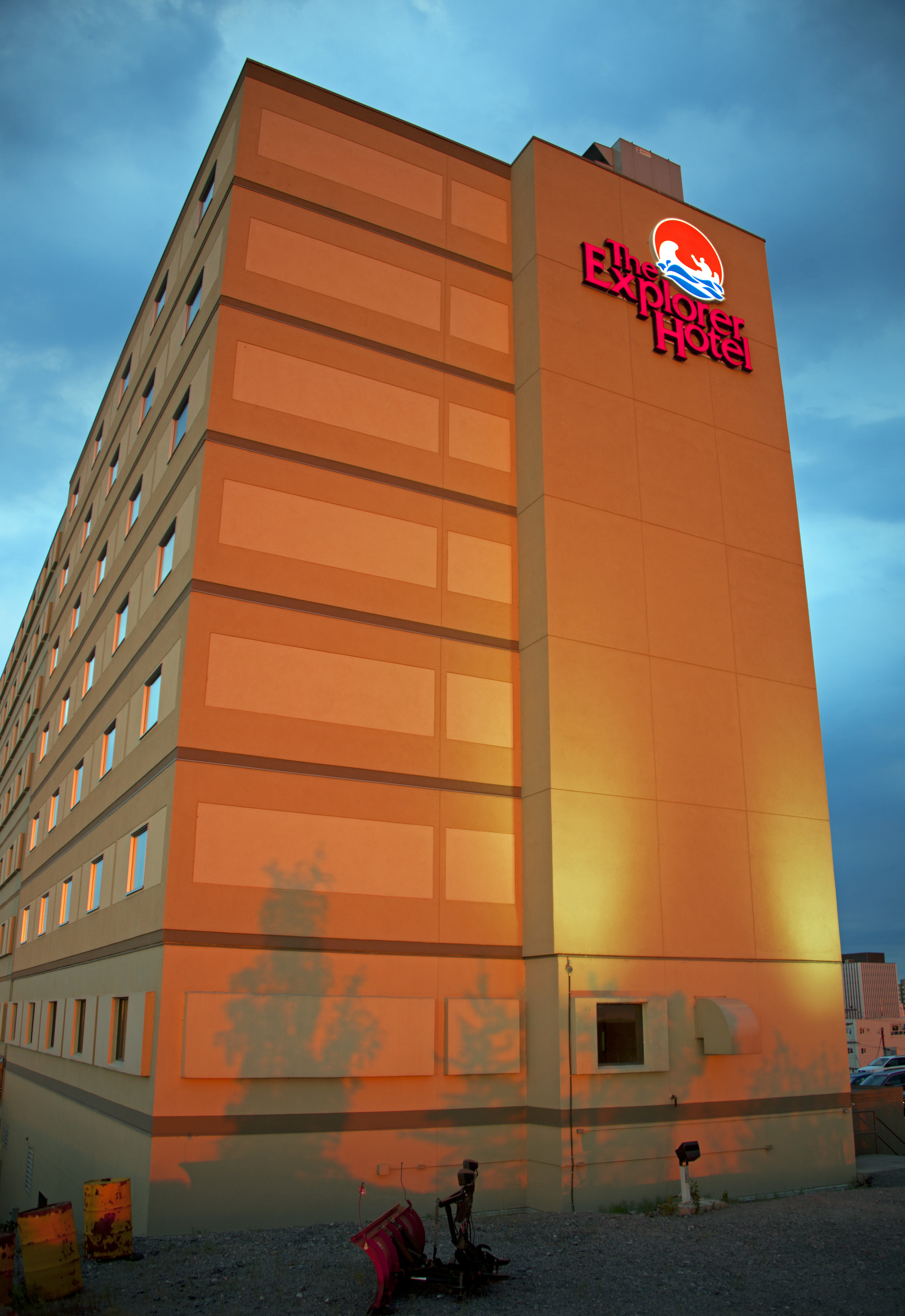
North facade

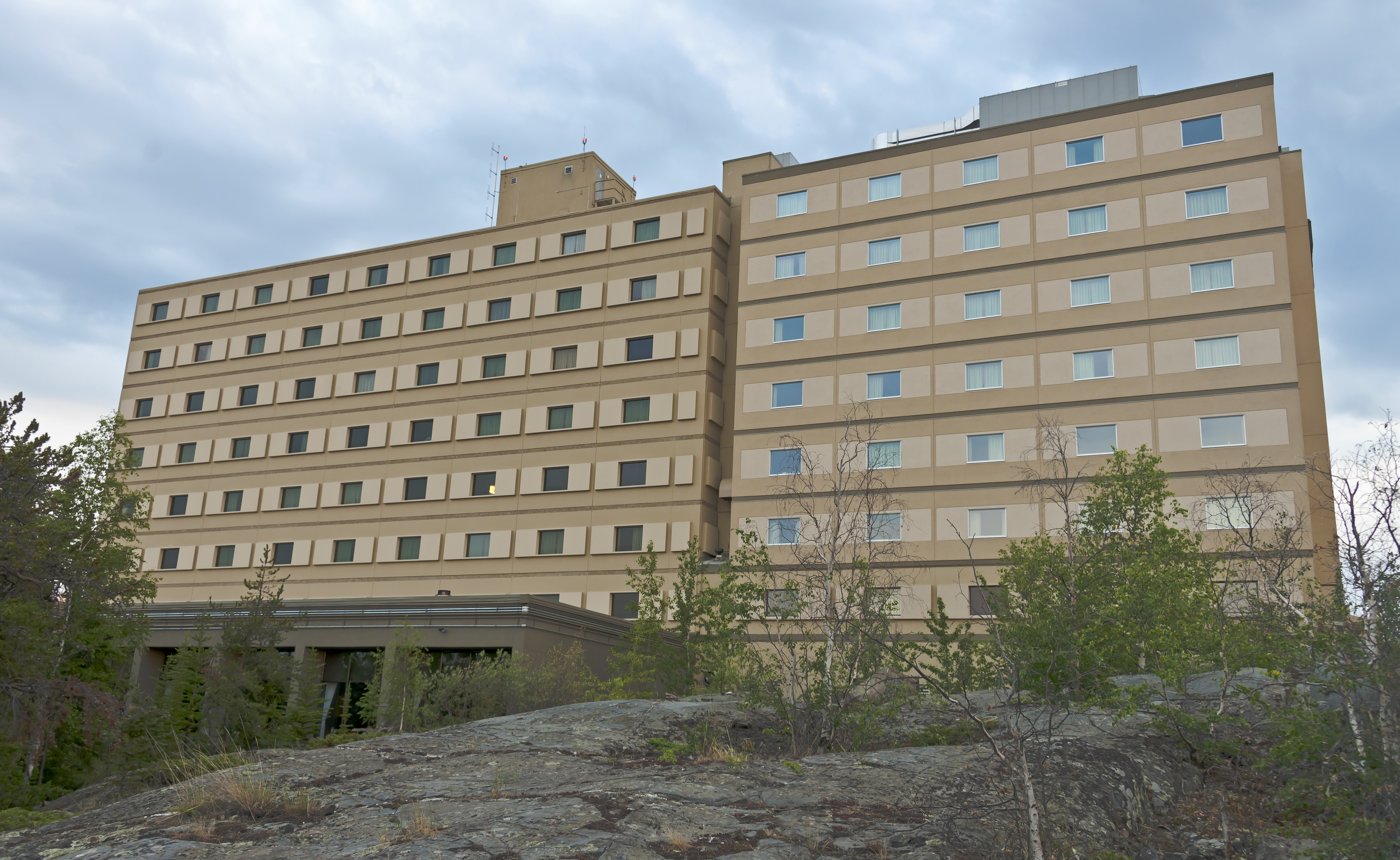
Rear view, from east

=== Interior ===
Sliding doors at the main entrance open into the main lobby, where the check-in desk is located. In the north wing is the hotel's business centre and several conference or banquet rooms, one of which features a mural by First Nations artist Alex Janvier. South of the lobby is its Trapline Lounge bar and more conference rooms, including the largest, the Katimavik. The elevators are located to the east; walking past them leads into the Traders Grill, a full-service restaurant.

The upper floors all have a central corridor offering access to rooms, with the elevator plaza in the centre. There are 187 guest rooms total. The hotel has 2,360 square metres (25,400 sq ft) of floor space.

== History ==
Originally a staging area for bush pilots heading for destinations further north, Yellowknife began to grow as a settlement in its own right when gold was discovered in the late 1930s. After a brief pause during the years of World War II, the growth continued in the 1950s, with the New Town being built to augment the Old Town, the original, more rustic city, on the peninsula leading into Great Slave Lake. In 1967, at the recommendation of the Carrothers Commission, the city was designated the capital of the Northwest Territories (which at the time included what is now Nunavut), making it as important politically as well as commercially.

With this new importance came visitors used to traveling in style. Construction on the Explorer, a hotel meant to cater to them, began in 1974 and completed in 1976. It was strategically located in a topographically prominent position along the highway leading from the airport to downtown. At that time it had 117 rooms.

By the end of the decade the hotel had played host to Prince Charles, who stayed there when he traveled to Yellowknife to speak at the dedication ceremonies for the Prince of Wales Northern Heritage Centre across the road. Actor Leonard Nimoy also stayed there at one point, as have Rick Mercer, Peter MacKay and former Canadian prime minister, Stephen Harper. The territory's legislative assembly sometimes held meetings at the Explorer until its own building was constructed further down 49th in 1993. The following year Queen Elizabeth II and her husband and consort, Prince Philip, stayed at the Explorer on their visit to Yellowknife. Also during the 1990s, the hotel expanded for the first time, adding 10 rooms on its second floor.

In 2004 Grandfield Pacific, the hotel's then-owner, agreed to sell it to Nunastar Properties, an Edmonton-based company which also owned the Frobisher Inn in Iqaluit, the territorial capital of recently created Nunavut, for CDN$6.35 million. Nunastar announced at the time that it planned significant renovations. "We plan to make it Yellowknife's premier hotel for business travellers," said Nunastar president Doug Cox.

The $2.4 million project began in 2007, with local firm Clark Builders handling the construction. By early 2008 it was finished, adding 60 more rooms. "I'm excited," said Rainer Launhardt, the Nunastar executive who supervised the expansion. "The bathrooms will be larger, and the rooms will be better—better being a relative term, seeing as how the rest of the hotel underwent renovations only two years ago." As part of the renovation, the Alex Janvier mural that had been in the lobby was moved to a dedicated banquet/conference room. The hotel invited him to refurbish the mural; he took advantage of the opportunity to expand and update it as well. The room was named for him.

Three years afterwards, the expanded hotel welcomed a third generation of the British royal family as guests when Prince William and his wife, Duchess Catherine, stayed there on their visit to Yellowknife shortly after their 2011 wedding. During their stay, the couple took meals in their suite to avoid creating a scene at the restaurant. A special menu was created for them reflecting their preference for eating light, consisting of English muffins and similar foods.

Among the guests at the expanded hotel were many visitors from Japan, who usually come during the cold and dark winter months to see the northern lights. In October 2014, one Japanese tourist, Atsumi Yoshikubo, was discovered to be missing when staff at the Explorer went to her room two days after she had failed to check out and found her bags, all packed. She herself had last been seen three days earlier walking down the Ingraham Highway west of the hotel, shortly after its own security cameras had recorded her leaving; many Yellowknifers took it upon themselves to search the expanses of taiga surrounding the city over the next week and a half until the Royal Canadian Mounted Police said their investigations led them to believe that Yoshikubo had intended to commit suicide by walking into the wilderness. Human remains, later identified in 2016 as that of Yoshikubo's, were found in a patch of woods off the highway near her personal effects 10 months later.

Around the time Yoshikubo's remains were found, the city approved plans for the Explorer's largest expansion yet. The hotel proposes to build a new wing on the west side of the current building's north end. It would add 72 more rooms, bringing its total to 259, and an additional banquet/conference room. The proposal was approved as another developer was also planning a 146-room hotel for the property next door, meant to compete with the Explorer.

== See also ==
- List of hotels in Canada
- Timeline of Yellowknife history
- Tourism in Canada
