= Timeline of Yellowknife history =

This timeline of Yellowknife history summarises key events in the history of Yellowknife, a city in the Northwest Territories, Canada.

== 19th century ==
- 1823 – Fur trading post called 'Old Fort Providence' located near Yellowknife Bay is closed by the Hudson's Bay Company.
- 1897 – Klondike Gold Rush started.
- 1898 – A Klondike-bound prospector, E.A. Blakeney, made the first discovery of gold in the Yellowknife Bay area. The discovery was viewed as unimportant in those days because of the Klondike Gold Rush and because Great Slave Lake was too far away to attract attention.

== 20th century ==
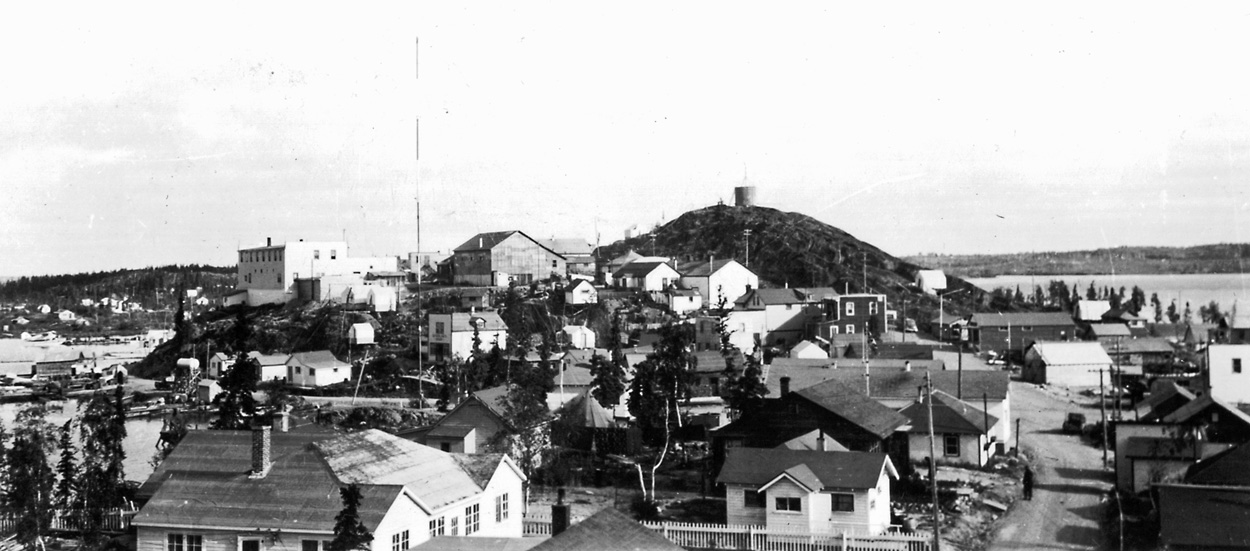
Yellowknife in the 1940s.

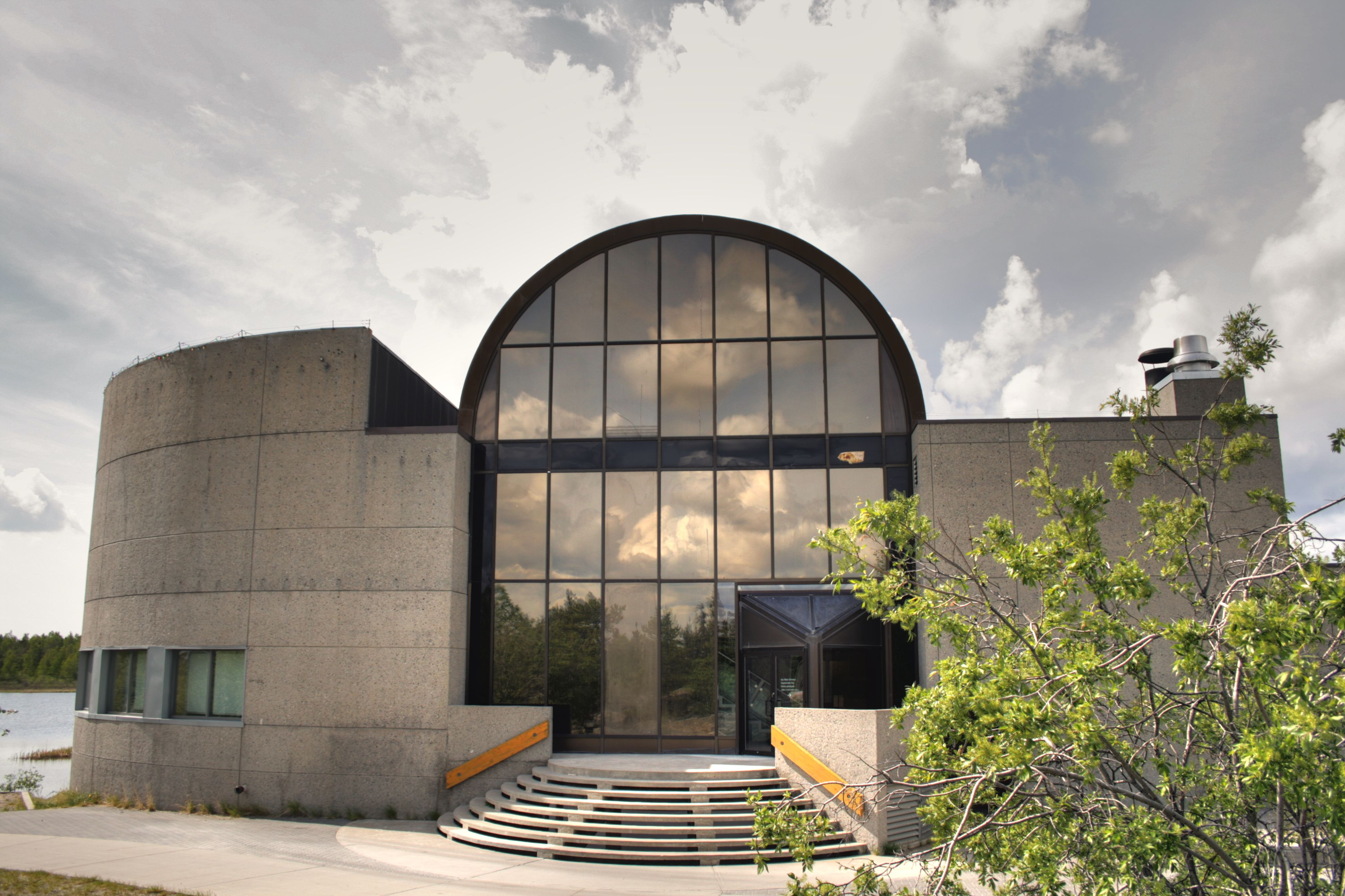
Prince of Wales Northern Heritage Centre

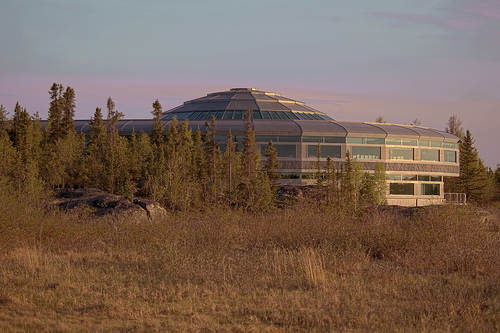
Northwest Territories Legislative Building, 1993

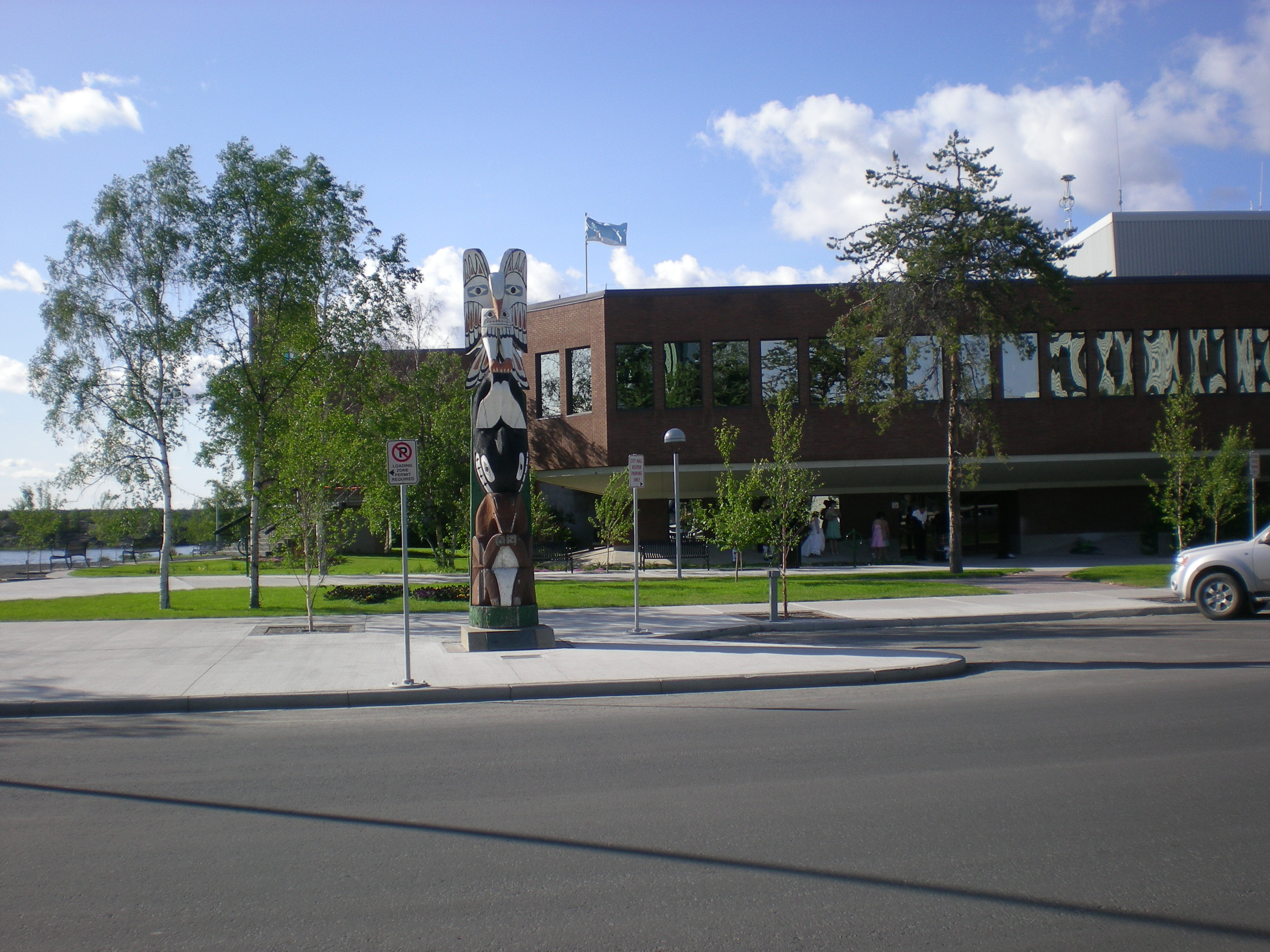
Yellowknife City Council

- 1929 – In the late 1920s, aircraft were first used to explore Canada's Arctic regions. Yellowknife Bay is a fuel cache point for aerial exploration to the arctic coastline.
- 1930 – By the 1930s First Nations people had a settlement on a point of land on the east side of Yellowknife Bay, Dettah.
- 1933 – Two prospectors, Herb Dixon and Johnny Baker, canoe down the Yellowknife River from Great Bear Lake to survey for possible mineral deposits. They found gold samples at Quyta Lake, about 30 km (19 mi) up the Yellowknife River, and some additional samples at Homer Lake.
- 1934 – Johnny Baker discovers gold on the east side of Yellowknife Bay in 1934 at what becomes the Burwash Mine.
- 1935–36 – The Burwash Mine is developed—the regions first underground gold project.
- 1935 – The Geological Survey of Canada under Dr. Alfred Jolliffe is dispatched to map the Yellowknife Bay region. One of their crews uncover gold in more favourable geology on the west side of Yellowknife Bay and a small staking rush occurs which leads to the staking of the Con and Negus Mines.
- 1936–37 – Con Mine was the most impressive gold deposit and its development created the excitement that led to the first settlement of Yellowknife in 1936–1937.
- 1937 – First evidence of a settlement on what becomes Yellowknife's Old Town waterfront. Business that are open during 1937 include: Corona Inn, Yellowknife Supplies Ltd, Weaver & Devore, Mining Corporation warehouses, and the Wildcat Cafe.
- 1938 – Yellowknife is booming and construction around Old Town and Latham Island is quickly proceeding. Canadian Bank of Commerce opens the first Yellowknife bank in February 1938. Vic Ingraham build his first hotel in July. A newspaper called The Prospector also starts that summer.
- 1938 – The Con Mine entered production on September 5 with the pouring of its first gold brick.
- 1939 – Mildred Hall, Yellowknife's first schoolteacher arrived; Mildred Hall School was named after her.
- 1939–53 – Yellowknife (Administrative district) created. Yellowknife was controlled by the Northern Affairs department (now Indigenous and Northern Affairs Canada) of the Government of Canada. A small council, partially elected and partially appointed, made decisions.
- 1940 – The population of Yellowknife quickly grew to 1,000 by 1940.
- 1942 – Five gold mines were in production in the Yellowknife region.
- 1943 – Gold production slows in Yellowknife as men and material like dynamite were needed for the war effort.
- 1944 – An exploration program at the Giant Mine property on the north end of town had suggested a sizable gold deposit in 1944. This new find resulted in a massive post-war staking rush to Yellowknife. A new period of financial excitement brings two new banks to Yellowknife: the Bank of Toronto and the Imperial Bank of Canada.
- 1945–46 – The Yellowknife townsite expanded from the Old Town waterfront, and the new townsite was established during 1945–1946.
- 1947 - in December, the Yellowknife Telephone Company commences service to the community.
- 1948 – Giant Mine begins gold production.
- 1949 – CFYK radio station starts broadcasting as a volunteer-run operation.
- 1950 – The Discovery Mine, with its own townsite, operated 81 km (50 mi) to the north-northeast of Yellowknife from 1950 to 1969.
- 1953 – By 1953, Yellowknife had grown so much that it was made a municipality, with its own council and town hall. The first mayor of Yellowknife is Jock McNiven.
- 1955 – Operation Bulldog III, a mock invasion from the north, is conducted around Yellowknife by the Canadian military to prepare for the possibility of Soviet forces doing it for real.
- 1958 – The Gold Range opened, one of the oldest and most colorful drinking establishments in the Northwest Territories was featured in Mordecai Richler's novel Solomon Gursky Was Here
- 1960 – Yellowknife Highway built.
- 1963 – Carrothers Commission established in April. Yellowknife Telephone Company acquired by Canadian National Telecommunications.
- 1967 – On September 18, Yellowknife officially became the capital of the Northwest Territories. This important new status sparked what has been coined as the third boom in Yellowknife. New sub-divisions were established to house an influx of government workers.
- 1967 – CFYK-TV first airs, broadcasting a monochrome signal of programs from videotapes flown in by CBC on a one-week delay.
- 1970 – Yellowknife hosts the 1st Arctic Winter Games.
- 1971 – Ecology North, a non-profit, grass-roots organization is formed out of public concern over arsenic contamination from Giant Mine.
- 1972 – The first edition of the Yellowknifer was published by Northern News Services. Mackenzie Media begins providing cable television service.
- 1973 - on January 5, CFYK-TV begins broadcasting in colour, with programs received by satellite including live broadcast programs such as news and sports.
- 1974 – The Explorer Hotel opens.
- 1978 – The Prince of Wales Northern Heritage Centre is opened. Prince Charles himself travels to Yellowknife to speak at the ceremony.
- 1978 – Malfunctioning nuclear-powered Soviet satellite Kosmos 954 breaks up upon descent, scattering radioactive debris across a large area centered around the city, putting Yellowknife in the world's media eye for several weeks.
- 1979 – CJCD starts broadcasting on the AM band 1240.
- 1980 – Folk on the Rocks is a local music festival that has been an annual occurrence since 1980, and features a wide variety of musical acts, and is not limited to only Folk.
- 1982 – Tibbitt to Contwoyto Winter Road first built to service the Lupin Mine.
- 1984 – Northern Arts and Cultural Centre opened on May 3.
- 1984 – Yellowknife hosted the 8th Arctic Winter Games.
- 1984 – Up Here magazine, focusing on Northern life, begins publication in the city.
- 1985 – The polar bear hide on the table used by the territorial legislative assembly in its temporary chambers, valued at CAN$10,000–15,000, was stolen; it has never been recovered.
- 1986 – L'Aquilon established.
- 1989 – Above&Beyond first issue.
- 1990 – Yellowknife hosted the 11th Arctic Winter Games.
- 1990 – SSI Micro founded.
- 1991 – A new mining rush and fourth building boom for Yellowknife began with the discovery of diamonds 300 km (190 mi) north of the city.
- 1992 – Aboriginal Peoples Television Network launched.
- 1992 – On September 18, nine workers are killed by a bomb at Giant Mine planted by striking miner Roger Warren. It is the deadliest incident of labour-related violence in Canadian history.
- 1993 – The Northwest Territories marked a new era when council moved into a newly constructed legislature building on November 17. The new legislature was the first building built specifically for the Northwest Territories government since the government sat in Regina 72 years earlier. The legislature building was constructed to feature themes derived from the Inuit culture, which signaled that the government was sensitive to the ethnicity of the resident population.
- 1995 – Warren is convicted in the Giant Mine bombing.
- 1998 – Canada's first diamond mine, Ekati Mine, opens in October 1998 north of Yellowknife.
- 1999 – On April 1, its purview as capital of the Northwest Territories was reduced when the territory of Nunavut was split from the NWT. Jurisdiction for Nunavut was transferred to the new capital city of Iqaluit.
- 1999 – Yellowknife Transit founded.
- 2000 – Gordon Van Tighem elected in October; he was acclaimed in 2003 and again in 2006. The Yellowknife City Council consists of a mayor and eight councilors elected to three year terms.
- 2000 – The NWT Mining Heritage Society is established.

== 21st century ==
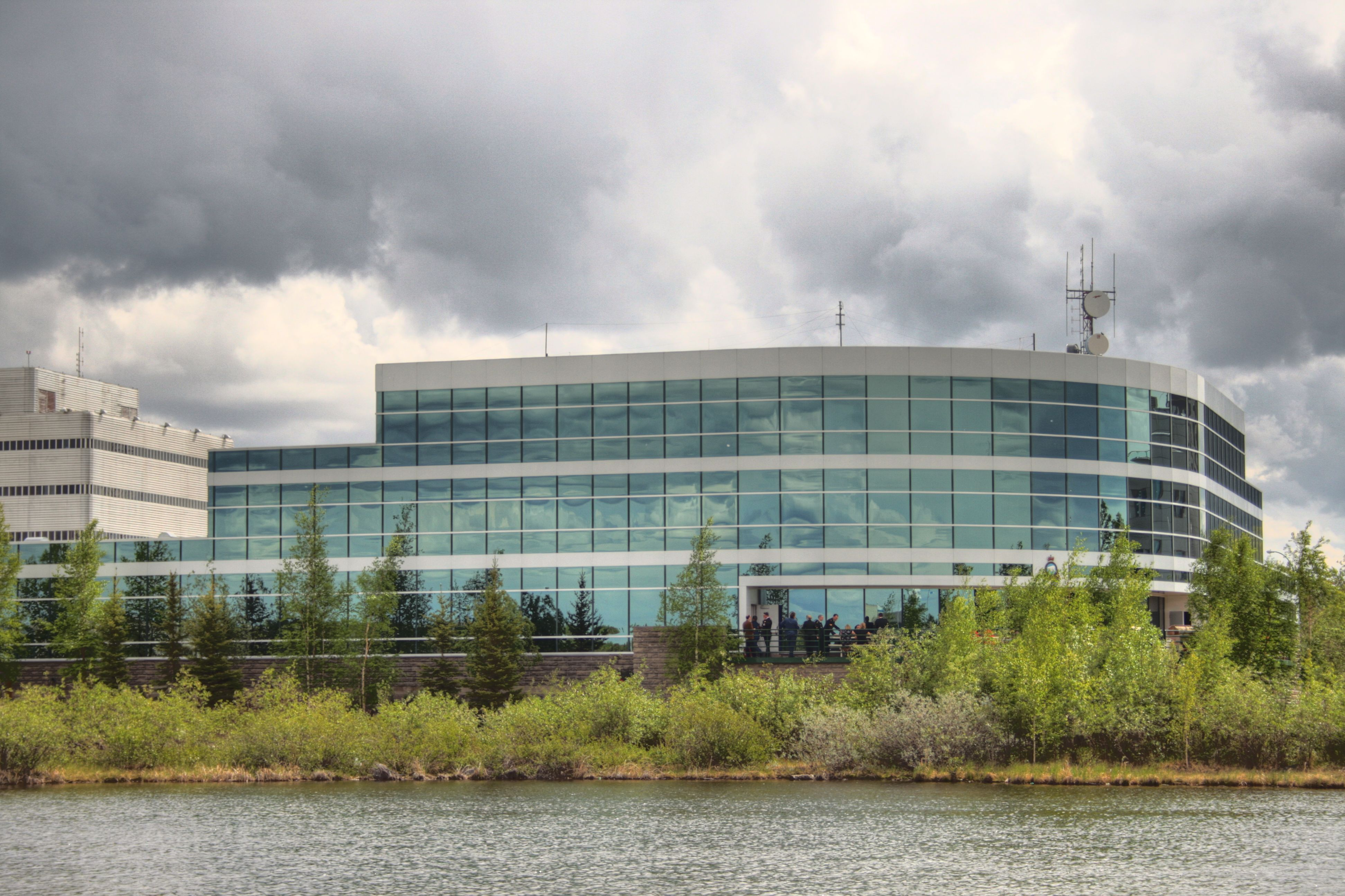
Joint Task Force North

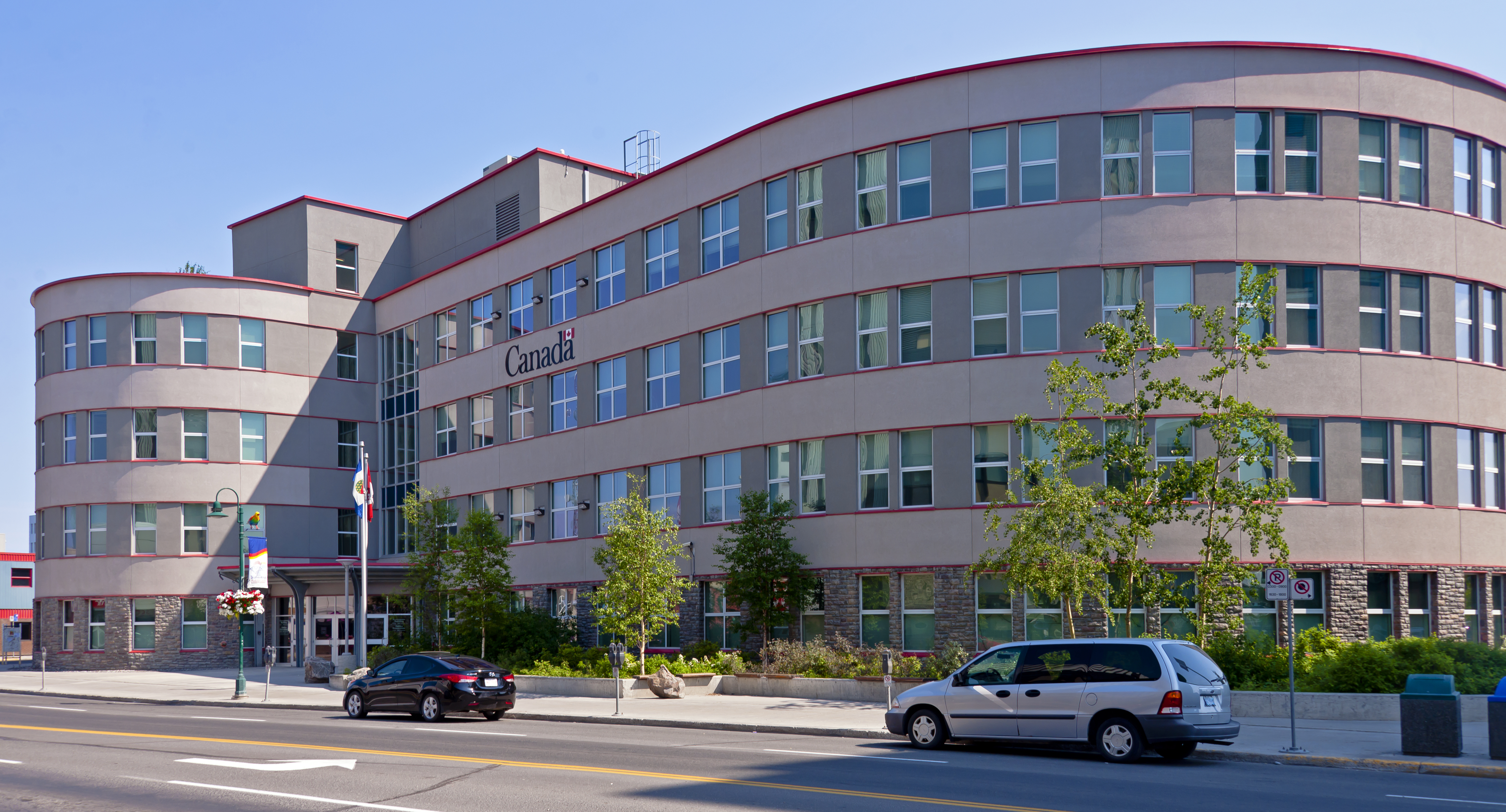
Greenstone Building

- 2003 – Economic growth in the Northwest Territories was 10.6% in 2003.
- 2004 – The last of the gold mines in Yellowknife closed, marking a turning point for Yellowknife's economy.
- 2004–05 – Visitors to the territory spent C$100.5 million. Tourism is the largest renewable industry in the NWT and Yellowknife is the main entry point for visitors. Many of these tourists are Japanese, and come to experience the northern climate and traditional lifestyle, as well as to see the northern lights.
- 2005 – As of the 2005 city survey, there were 19,429 people and 5,795 households in the city. The population density was 142.86 people/km² (369.85 people/sq. mi).
- 2006 – The 2006 Canadian Census found that 22.2% of residents identified as indigenous.
- 2006 – Canadian Forces Northern Area was dissolved and replaced by Joint Task Force (North). CFNA HQ Yellowknife is the headquarters for Joint Task Force (North).
- 2007 – During the 2007 ice road season, several drivers were featured on the History Channel TV series Ice Road Truckers.
- 2007 – The Yellowknife Airport (IATA: YZF) is the busiest airport in northern Canada, having 70,699 aircraft movements in 2007 and handling over 400,000 passenger and 30,000 tonnes (33,000 short tons) of cargo yearly.
- 2007 – The Greenstone Building downtown, completed on schedule and under budget two years before to consolidate 20 different federal agencies' offices into one place, is certified LEED Gold for its sustainability, the first building in the North so recognized.
- 2008 – Yellowknife hosted the 18th Arctic Winter Games.
- 2009 – Yellowknife Online was established and started publishing regularly.
- 2014 – Japanese tourist Atsumi Yoshikubo goes missing in late October after last being seen walking along the Ingraham Trail north of the city, attracting news coverage nationally and in her native country. After a week, massive searches of the bush by land and air are called off after the RCMP announce that she had apparently intended to kill herself. Her body is found the following summer by a hiker.
- 2020 – COVID-19 pandemic in the Northwest Territories.
- 2023 – Wildfire.

== See also ==
- List of years in Canada
- History of Northwest Territories capital cities
- Yellowknife Water Aerodrome
