= Operation Bulldog =

Operation Bulldog may refer to:

- Operation Bulldog I, the first in a series of military exercises during the Cold War carried out in Canada
- Operation Bulldog II, the second in a series of military exercises during the Cold War carried out in Canada
- Operation Bulldog III, a military exercise during the Cold War in Yellowknife, NWT
- Operation Bulldog Mammoth, was a brigade-sized cordon and search of an Abu Ghurayb apartment complex, northwest of Baghdad on December 4, 2003
