= Death of Atsumi Yoshikubo =

Japanese woman found in wilderness of Canadian North

Atsumi Yoshikubo
- 吉窪昌美
- Image of Yoshikubo distributed at time of her disappearance
- Born: November 3, 1968
- Disappeared: October 22, 2014 (aged 45); Yellowknife, Northwest Territories, Canada
- Status: Found dead
- Body discovered: August 31, 2015; Outside Yellowknife
- Occupation: Psychiatrist
- Height: 157 cm (5 ft 2 in)

Around midday on October 22, 2014, a passing motorist saw an Asian woman walking north along the Ingraham Trail on the outskirts of Yellowknife in the Northwest Territories, Canada. Several days later, after seeing stories in the local media that 45-year old Atsumi Yoshikubo (吉窪昌美) who had been visiting the city from her home in southern Japan, had gone missing, she reported the sighting. It was the last time Yoshikubo was seen alive.

Yoshikubo's absence was first noted five days after that sighting, when staff at her hotel noticed she had not checked out two days after her stay was due to have ended. In her room they found her luggage, still packed; she had apparently never boarded her flight home. Footage from the hotel's security camera showed her leaving shortly before she was last seen along the road. When that sighting was reported in the news, it suggested to many residents that she might have gotten lost in the vast expanse of taiga surrounding the city, and they augmented official search efforts with their own ventures into the bush.

The case attracted considerable media interest not only across Canada but also in Japan, where Yellowknife is a popular destination for those seeking to view the northern lights. A week after Yoshikubo's disappearance, the Royal Canadian Mounted Police (RCMP) announced that they were calling off the search, as their investigation, in cooperation with Japanese police, had led them to believe that she had intended to take her own life. Her family, from whom she had been estranged for some time, doubted that conclusion, pointing to evidence that suggested she intended to return.

Over the next ten months, police continued searching for the body they expected to find, using areas she may have visited for training exercises. On August 31, 2015, a hiker found some of her personal effects, along with human remains, in a wooded area north of the city. The RCMP confirmed that the items belonged to Yoshikubo, and began to identify the DNA from the bone fragments. In April 2016 they were matched to Yoshikubo, and the investigation has been officially closed.

== Background ==
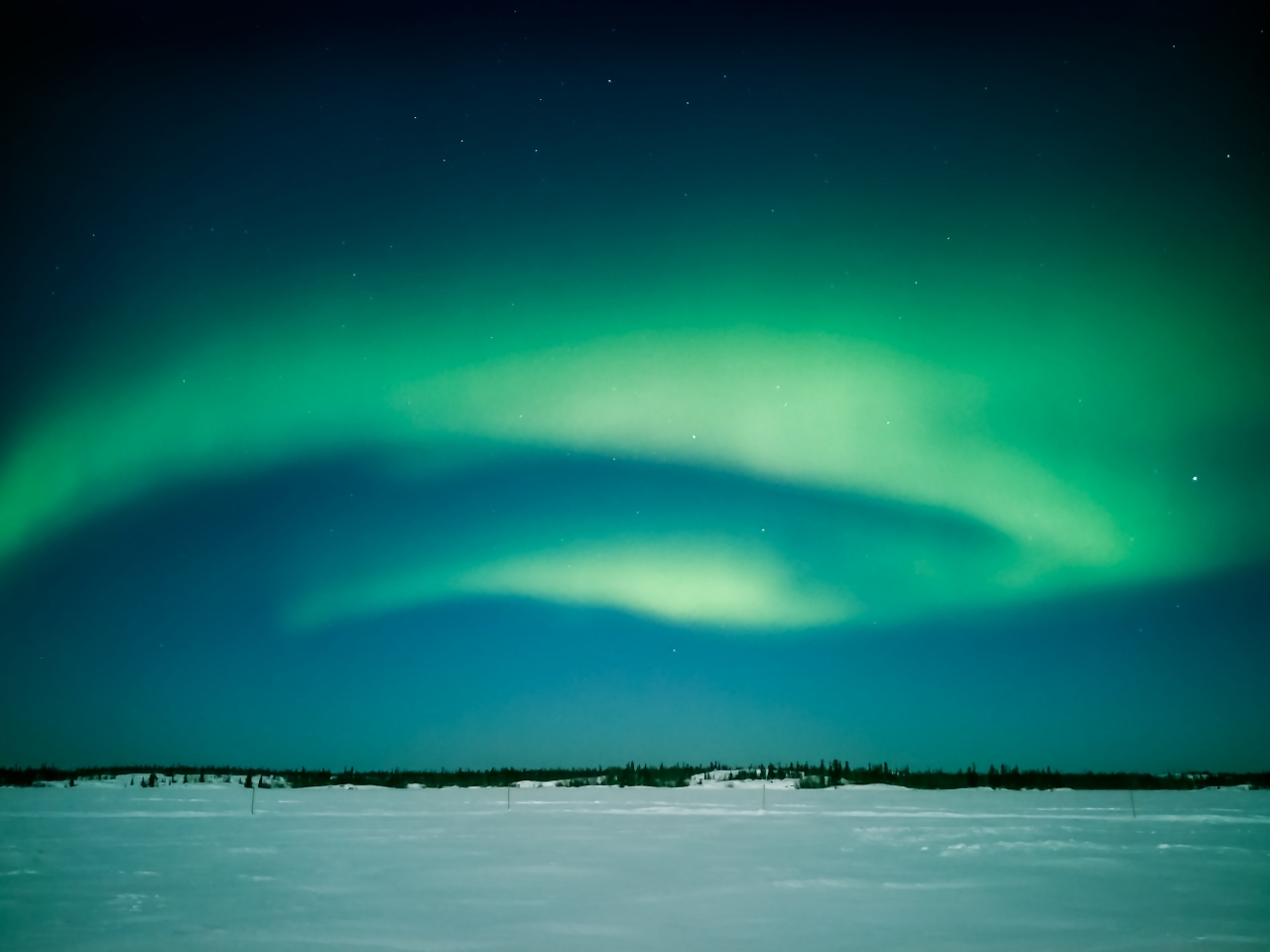
Aurora display near Yellowknife

Since the early 1990s, Yellowknife, capital of Canada's Northwest Territories, has become a popular destination for tourists from Japan. Many come to see the northern lights; while it is locally believed that Japanese folklore holds that a child conceived under them will enjoy good luck and good health, this is an urban legend resulting from a joke on an episode of the American television series Northern Exposure. Although Alaska and Scandinavia are also attractive for their auroral displays, Yellowknife is a particularly desirable location for Japanese aurora tourism due to its generally flat and undeveloped surrounding terrain and predominantly clear (albeit cold) weather during its long winter nights. It is estimated that 20% of the city's tourists come from Japan; many hotels publish their restaurant menus in both Japanese and English.

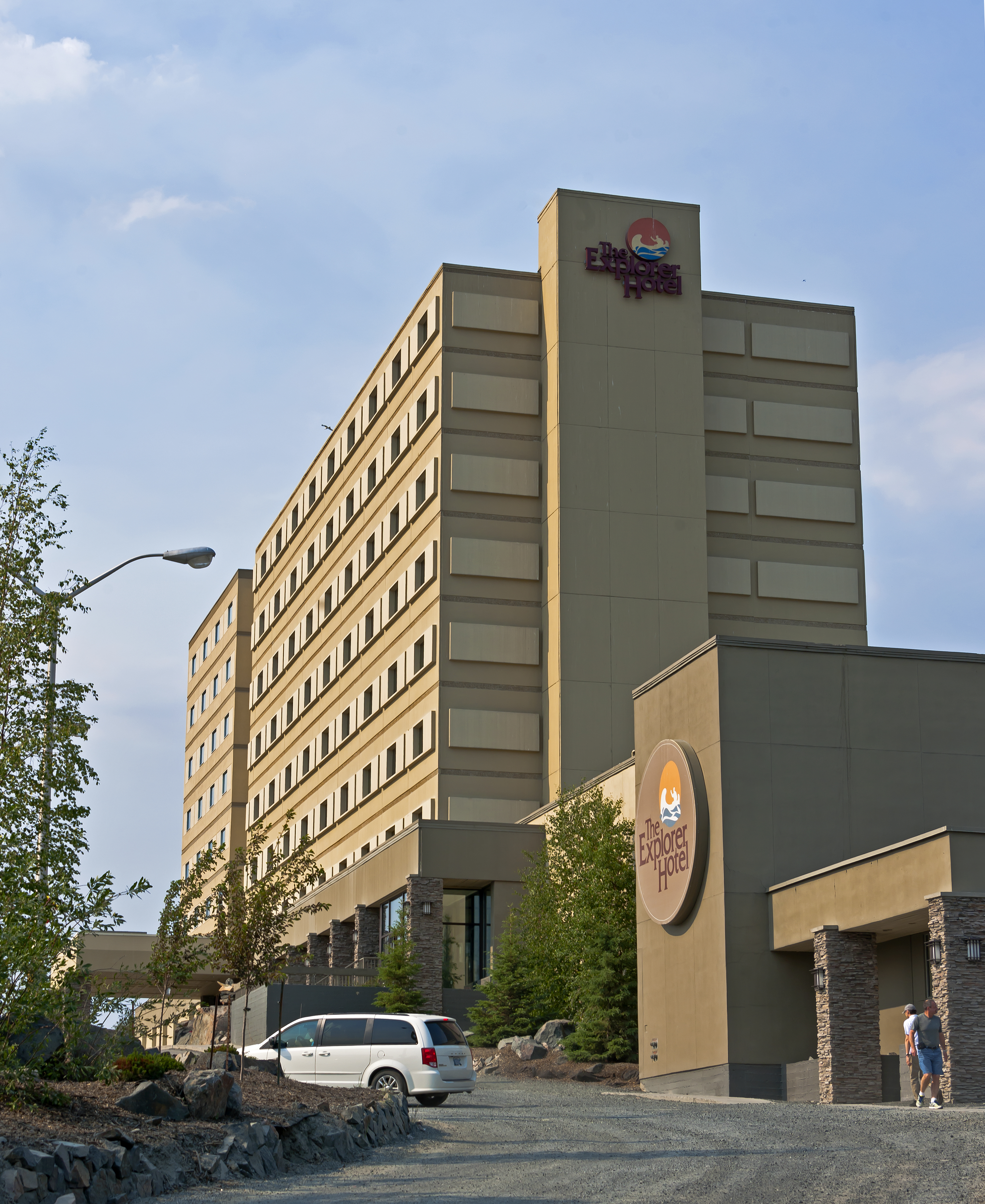
The Explorer Hotel

Unaccompanied, Yoshikubo arrived in Yellowknife from her home in the city of Uto, on the southern Japanese island of Kyushu, on October 17, 2014, a trip she had arranged through a tour operator in Toronto. She checked into the Explorer Hotel, the city's largest, for a week's stay. After doing so, she asked if she could book a seat on an aurora tour and was told they had shut down for the season.

October and November are off-peak times for Japanese tourism in Yellowknife. The northern lights are not as visible as they are at other times of the year and there is usually not enough snow cover for dogsledding, another activity popular with tourists who visit the city in winter. There is, however, enough to make walking on the trails through the boreal forest and bedrock outcrops in and around the city potentially dangerous for unprepared, unguided visitors. The trails themselves become icy and swampy, and the snow makes it harder to distinguish them from the surrounding bush.

== Disappearance ==
In the absence of an organized tour—the way 95% of Japanese visitors see Yellowknife; the rest generally come in groups—Yoshikubo apparently set her own itinerary, keeping to herself. She had travelled alone before, and it is not unusual for Japanese women to do so. However, Japanese women who travel unaccompanied to popular tourist destinations typically congregate informally with other tourists when they get there; Yoshikubo, though, continued to keep to herself.

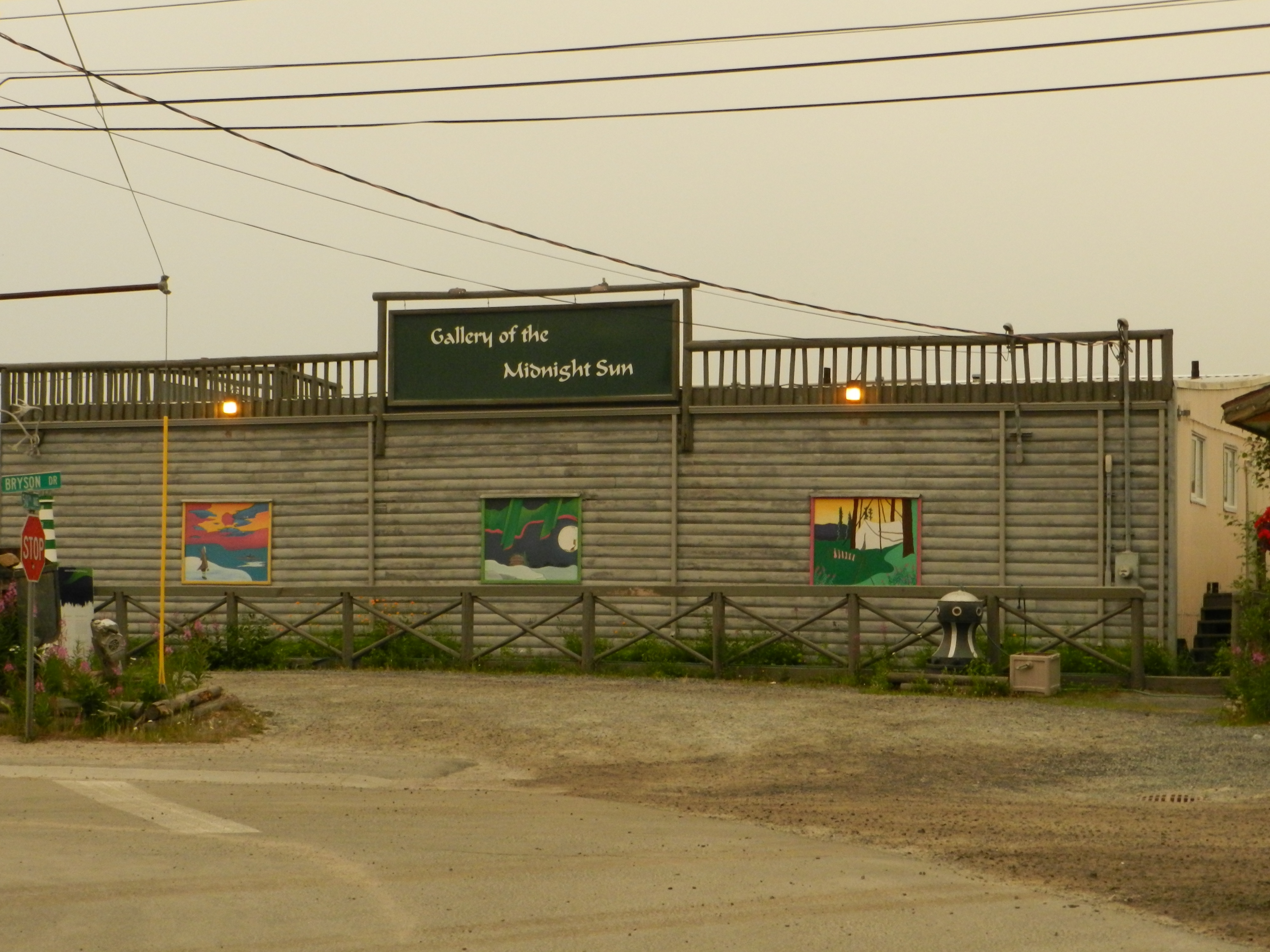
The Gallery of the Midnight Sun

Security cameras at the Gallery of the Midnight Sun, a popular local gift and souvenir shop in the city's Old Town, recorded her visiting, by herself, and buying some items, apparently meant as gifts for others, on October 19. At another time that day cameras at the city's tourist information centre recorded her visit, again alone. In both she was wearing a pink coat and a darker pink hat with black pants and white shoes.

Yoshikubo's actions over the next two days are unknown. During the morning hours of October 22, the Explorer's security cameras recorded her leaving the building, wearing the same clothing she had been seen in the two days previous. Later, around 11:30 a.m., Jessica Riehl, a retired constable with the Royal Canadian Mounted Police (RCMP), saw Yoshikubo walking along the Ingraham Trail between Niven and Jackfish lakes near the city's northern limits, a largely undeveloped area. She reported the sighting, the last time Yoshikubo is known to have been seen, several days later when news of the Japanese woman's disappearance broke (although she was not completely confident as to the date, since she said she takes that route regularly).

Yoshikubo never returned to her hotel. Three days later, when the staff realized she had either left without checking out or overstayed her reservation, they entered her room. Inside they found her luggage, all packed. They reported her missing to the RCMP, who checked at Yellowknife's airport, where they learned she had not boarded her flight home, either.

== Search ==
The RCMP began an intense search effort, using both personnel on the ground and aerial assets to cover the expanses of taiga north and west of the city near where Yoshikubo had last been seen, or could have been reasonably expected to have walked to from her hotel. Residents, fearing that she had met with foul play on the trails and motivated by concern for her distant family, joined in the search with their own informal efforts. The search was given extra urgency by the onset of colder wintry weather and lengthening nights.

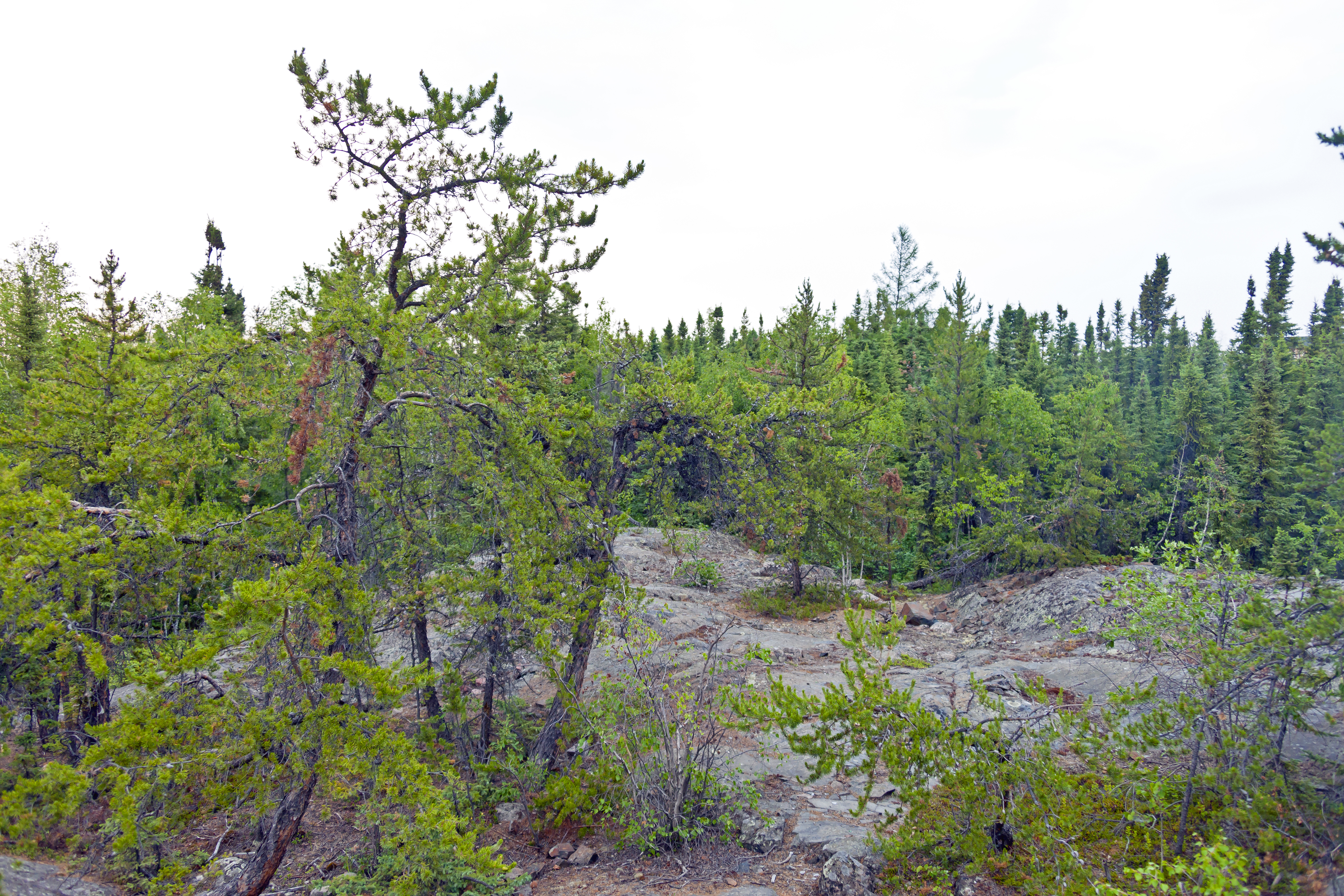
Taiga and bedrock terrain typical of searched areas

The disappearance and search became a national news story, with five Japanese news outlets flying crews to Yellowknife to cover it for audiences in their country. There were concerns that the incident could result in less Japanese tourism in the city. Of the 60,000 Japanese who had come to Yellowknife to see the northern lights since 2008, she was the first one ever to be reported missing, according to the country's consulate in Calgary.

On November 4, however, the RCMP called off the search. Based on what they had found in Yoshikubo's hotel room, and information developed by Japanese police investigating in Uto, they believed she had "arrived in Yellowknife with a plan to go into the wilderness alone and become a missing person". Further, they claimed, she had "taken steps to avoid detection"; however, they declined to give specifics as the case was still open and her body remained undiscovered.

In Japan, Fuji Television reported that Yoshikubo's brother said he had been contacted by the country's Ministry of Foreign Affairs and told that his sister had sent a letter to a female friend before she left suggesting she was planning to end her life in Canada. While her brother believed that the letter existed, he admitted he had not read it. He also doubted that his sister, who had been out of contact with him and their father for ten years, truly intended to die in Yellowknife, pointing to the souvenirs she had been shown purchasing and her return ticket.

== Aftermath ==
"They're continuing to still search and conduct different investigations and follow leads they're getting," an RCMP spokeswoman told Northern News Services a week after the search was called off. "It's just that the search and rescue is done. Just because that part is over, doesn't mean we're giving up." Searchers were concentrating on an area north of the city, using dogs and thermal imaging equipment to supplement their legwork.

Many residents had been profoundly moved by the incident, whether they took part in the search or not. One resident had a condolence card set up for residents to sign at city hall to be sent to Yoshikubo's family in Japan. "I know there was a tremendous amount of local support for the search and I think it's a way for Yellowknifers to let Atsumi's family in Japan know our thoughts are with her family," said city councilman Dan Wong, who announced it at the council's November 10 meeting.

Jessica Riehl, the retired RCMP constable who was the last person known to have seen Yoshikubo, recalled how she had considered asking her if she needed any help.

[A]s I drove past her[,] I thought it might not be the best idea for her being alone." She had considered turning around and going back to offer help, but decided against it. "I thought, it was only 11:30 a.m., she'll be OK ... She looked like she was sightseeing and it was close to zero, it wasn't freezing cold, and her pink coat was knee-length and she had on mitts and a hat—she was dressed for that temperature.

After learning several days later that the woman had been reported missing, Riehl said "I just felt terrible. I didn't sleep much that night. We talked about it at work the next day and how important it is to listen to that little voice on your shoulder ... I will always wonder what happened or if I had stopped, if it would have made a difference in any way."

Recovery efforts continued in warmer weather, albeit on a smaller scale. For its exercises and training sessions, the RCMP's search and rescue team chose areas of the taiga where Yoshikubo might have gone. They kept those locations confidential to ensure that only trained personnel who knew how to process the scene found the body if there was one to be found.

=== Motivation ===
There was some speculation about why Yoshikubo might have chosen to die by walking into the bush around Yellowknife. Simon Hatcher, a professor of psychiatry at the University of Ottawa, said that most long wilderness sojourns are a form of temporary suicide, from which people return feeling better. "People who are suicidal can have this fantasy where they can have a temporary escape—a temporary suicide," he told the National Post. "And maybe that way they will stand out, and somebody will come along and save them. Maybe this was some form of this woman testing fate."

Others wondered why, given popular locations in Japan such as the Aokigahara forest near Mount Fuji, where there are many suicides each year due to the intense seclusion, for that sort of wilderness suicide, Yoshikubo had traveled so far for hers. "Sometimes people romanticize about how they might control their death, and they can become fixated on a place," the director of a Toronto suicide prevention centre told the Post. "Maybe this woman came to Canada to create some distance from her family, and to spare them from it."

=== Possible effect on tourism ===
In the immediate aftermath, concerns were expressed that the incident would result in a drop in Japanese tourism to Yellowknife, although it would not be known what impact there would be until wintertime, the next most popular time to see the auroras. "This will frighten the Japanese culture that a person has gone missing," said the director of the territorial tourism information centre that Yoshikubo had been videotaped visiting. However, Colin Dempsey, president of the Northern Frontier Visitors' Association, said that while he was sad for her family that she had apparently met her end in the area, among member businesses, "there is also a sense of relief that foul play has been ruled out in her disappearance."

Similarly, he also believed that the elimination of the possibility of an accidental death would allay any potential concerns. He said the information centre had not received any inquiries from Japan about whether people should reconsider going to Yellowknife as a result of the disappearance. The manager of two local tour operators said, likewise, that there had been no cancellations by Japanese tourists.

Among the small Japanese Canadian community in the city, most of whom make their living in businesses serving that particular tourist market, there was some concern that similarly suicidally inclined Japanese would try to emulate her. One tour operator doubted the possibility, noting that the costs of traveling to Yellowknife were too high. But, he said, he and his colleagues needed to be more vigilant in dissuading Japanese visitors from going out alone at night into the bush, since they could get lost as he feared Yoshikubo had done.

By December, these concerns proved unfounded. Tour operators said that, in fact, not only were numbers not down, they had actually increased from the year before. "It didn't have any impact," said one kennel owner, who estimated that half his business came from Japan.

== Discovery of remains and identification ==
At the beginning of September 2015, the RCMP announced that a hiker in an area off the Ingraham north of the city had found personal effects that were confirmed to be Yoshikubo's. Along with the effects were human remains. However, the agency said, it could take months of forensic testing before it could be determined whether or not those remains were hers. In April 2016 the RCMP confirmed the remains were of Yoshikubo, and announced that the case was closed. Since only bone fragments were left, they would not be able to perform an autopsy.

== See also ==
- List of solved missing person cases (post-2000)
- Timeline of Yellowknife history
- Tourism in Canada
