= Bulldog edition =

Early edition of a daily newspaper

A bulldog edition is an early edition, or the first edition, of a daily newspaper and can be dated in advance. It is sometimes called the street edition.

== Purpose ==
The purpose of a bulldog edition has been defined as intended for distribution out of town or for "distant readers." These editions also attracted street sales, as opposed to home delivery.

== Publication date ==
Journalism professor Frank Thayer wrote in 1954 that a Sunday bulldog edition

is often printed as early as the Tuesday preceding the date it bears and is sent to far distant points . . . in many cases as far ahead of its date as Thursday or Friday. If it is not sold until Sunday, it is not properly a bulldog edition, but it is a Sunday predate.

A 1993 article in Books at Iowa said that a bulldog edition is "often composed largely of material from the previous day's last edition."

== Etymology ==
Writer H.L. Mencken tried to track down the name but reported, "Origin of bulldog has been discussed at great length but so far as I know the problem has never been solved."

Theories that have been offered for the derivation of the term have been:

=== Competition ===
An early explanation of the origin of the term came from the trade magazine Editor & Publisher, which said in 1932 or before that the usage "probably" began in the 1890s when the New York World, the Herald and the Journal "fought like bulldogs" to "get out editions that would catch the mails going out of town."

A letter from S.L. Dare of the reference department, Editor & Publisher, stated in 1940:

A good many years ago, when the New York newspapers were fighting for circulation, the World and the American (I think) struggled furiously to get the first morning edition on a train for the west. It was said that they fought like bulldogs; hence that particular edition has always been known as the "bulldog."

The Encyclopedia of Word and Phrase Origins suggested that

the term dates back to New York City’s newspaper wars of the 1890s, when rival papers were competing for morning readers with special editions sold by street vendors very early in the day. These papers were baptized "bulldogs" presumably because the publishers fought like bulldogs over circulation.

=== Night workers ===
It was a borrowing from nautical terminology, the dog watch being an evening shift, when printers had to work to put out an early edition for a morning paper.

=== Other ===
Other suggested derivations of the term:

- Jerry Walker, managing editor of Editor & Publisher magazine, thought the name was applied to an early edition because "it was the first to bark."
- An unidentified Chicago circulation manager said that the Saturday night editions of Sunday newspapers were called "pup" editions, and as they grew in size and circulation, the term was changed to "bulldog."
- An editor of the publication Dog World said the term arose around 1905 when a dog breeder wrote to the Philadelphia Evening Bulletin asking for a copy of the newspaper that "had the bulldog on the front page." The staff found the photo in the first edition on that date, and so thereafter they referred to the first run of the day's paper as the "bulldog edition."
- The Cincinnati Tribune obtained an exclusive photo of a murder victim and, after it was printed in the first edition, the Tribune's circulation manager allowed no newspapers to leave the plant without a man seated on each bundle (to safeguard the exclusive). The manager was quoted as saying, "I put me bulldogs on every bundle." After that, all the predated issues were called "bulldogs."
- "The term is supposed to have originated a half century ago when one of the Hearst newspapers, to identify its early edition, started printing a picture of one of owner William Randolph Hearst's favorite bulldogs."

== Complaints ==
In the early- and mid-20th century, some complaints were made that the publication of news in a bulldog edition was dishonest or led to mistakes.

- The New York Tribune complained in 1908 that the Sunday bulldog editions of other New York City newspapers contained "simply the Saturday afternoon news under a Sunday dateline."
- The Weekly Clarion-Ledger of Jackson, Mississippi, reported in June 1911 that the Memphis Commercial Appeal had erroneously printed a story about the deaths of a judge's family because it rushed the news into a bulldog edition without waiting for confirmation. The Jackson newspaper concluded that any bulldog edition was:
  a fraud, a fake and delusion, a half made-up affair, pretending to be a newspaper when much of the matter it prints is old and some absolutely reliable — a newspaper pretense only; a sheet intended to blanket other papers that will not stoop to the "bulldog" trick.
- In January 1912, The Evening Times of Sayre, Pennsylvania, said that a bulldog edition was:
  an edition run off in a hurry without regard to news value to catch mail trains for rural circulation. Anything in the line of news is considered good enough for these 'bulldog editions' of afternoon newspapers. The main idea is to "get out" and "get away with it." Late editions of afternoon newspapers . . . are really nothing more than morning editions rewritten.
- The Nevada State Journal of Reno complained in February 1932 that "The daily newspapers issue a bulldog edition printed especially for what they call the rube trade and which is delivered in Reno under the guise of news."
- In March 1933 the Evening Leader of Staunton, Virginia, complained that the metropolitan newspapers were "not morning papers at all but are, in newspaper parlance, 'bulldog editions' printed between 7 and 8 p.m." but they claimed to be morning editions.
- The Citizen of Columbus, Ohio, printed and distributed a story in a June 1940 bulldog edition about the birth of a baby even before the baby was born, early the next morning.
- In June 1942, The Daily Independent of Murphysboro, Illinois, claimed that the Chicago Daily News had broken a release date when it published a list of war casualties in its bulldog edition distributed the day before its issue date.
- According to columnist Drew Pearson, a speech by U.S. Labor Secretary Maurice Tobin was wrongly reported in the bulldog editions of "many big cities" in January 1949 when Tobin abandoned a prepared speech he had handed out to reporters and instead spoke informally for about four minutes.

== Controversies ==
- Syndicated columnist Richard Massock reported in March 1931 that the press time for the bulldog edition of a "metropolitan newspaper, one of the largest in America," had suddenly been made earlier by twenty minutes, "changing the routine of hundreds of men and tons of machinery." The reason, said Massock, was that "the publisher had resumed going to a suburban estate for the weekends" and that he "had ordered the great rollers of his plant to begin grinding out the thousands of copies of the bulldog edition a few minutes earlier so that a single copy could be sent to him on a certain train."
- In the midst of 1982 negotiations with a labor union, the management of the New York Daily News threatened to cancel the paper's bulldog edition and make other cutbacks to shrink circulation, possibly leading to an end to the nation's largest daily newspaper. The threat was not carried out.

== Startups ==
The Seattle Post-Intelligencer began new early editions in 1922. A "Pippin edition" was issued every Sunday at 6:30 p.m. in advance of the regular bulldog, to carry on its front page the latest baseball scores. The newspaper said the edition "corresponds somewhat with the Peach edition issued by the Chicago Herald-Examiner." There was also a Rabbit edition, designed for Montana, the Dakotas, and other territory east of the Washington state line.

In October 1931, the Honolulu Advertiser started an experimental home delivery of a bulldog edition of the next day's paper, to be delivered between 7 and 8:30 p.m.

The St. Louis Post-Dispatch, an afternoon newspaper, in October 1983 started a bulldog edition that was on sale by 10 a.m. downtown and "slightly later" elsewhere.

The Detroit Free Press, a morning paper, in 1983 unveiled a bulldog edition that was available at convenience stores and in the newspaper's dispensing boxes in the evening.

The Tampa Tribune of Tampa, Florida, in September 1998 began a bulldog edition, which it said would be a "day-early edition of the Sunday paper." It was to be available at convenience stores and supermarkets in certain counties. The newspaper said:

The new product is a twist on a decades-old tool being rejuvenated in recent years by newspapers in such cities as Dallas, Fort Worth, Pittsburgh, Atlanta, Houston, Palm Beach and Miami. It is aimed at selling more papers by attracting readers who want a jump on clipping coupons and reading the retail and classified advertising sections [and to] bump up circulation that has been sagging or flat in some cities because of changing reader habits.

Tribune publisher Reid Ashe said in 1998 that newspapers which had begun the practice had posted circulation gains from 5,000 to 75,000 copies after introducing bulldogs, which extended the shelf life of the Sunday newspapers.

The Tribune bulldog was to be "vastly different from the typical Sunday paper," Ashe said, so that it would not "look like a newspaper." Its front page was to be made up "exclusively of headlines, photos and short promotions of stories featured inside the paper."

The Palm Beach Post introduced a bulldog on August 29, 1998, and saw a "circulation bump."

== Other uses ==
A Broadway theater in New York City used the term in March 1912 to identify a special afternoon performance of "The Truth Wagon," a newspaper-themed play at Daly's Theater, "for the benefit of the morning newspaper men."

In 1980, a race horse named Bulldog Edition was running in Pennsylvania.

In November 1978, the New York Daily News began a radio program called Bulldog Edition that presented news which would be in the next day's newspaper.

== In popular culture ==
- A play called Bulldog Edition, written by A.R Crews, a Northwestern University student, was produced at Northwestern in August 1934. Touted as a "comedy of newspaper life," it was set to be produced at other schools and colleges in the winter.
- Bulldog Edition was also the name of a motion picture produced in 1936 and directed by Charles Lamont.
- In the 1940 film Citizen Kane, Kane tells his wife, Susan, “The bulldog's just gone to press,” to which Susan sarcastically replies, "Well, hurray for the bulldog!"
- Bulldog Edition was a nightly news summary on WNET, Channel Thirteen, ca. 1989.
