= Frame Lake =

Lake in the Northwest Territories, Canada

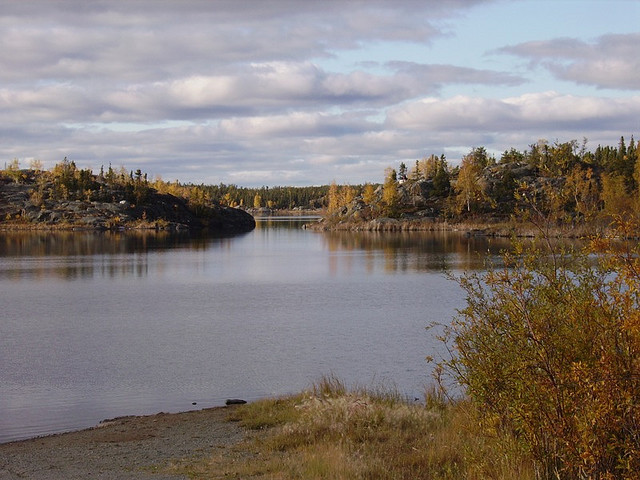
- Lake in summer 2005

- Location within Northwest Territories
- Location: Yellowknife, Northwest Territories, Canada
- Coordinates: 62.454°N 114.390°W
- Type: Endorheic
- Etymology: Bill Frame, early miner and businessman
- Primary inflows: Two unnamed local streams
- Primary outflows: Seepage
- Surface area: 84 hectares (210 acres)
- Max. depth: 6.5 metres (21 ft)
- Surface elevation: 186 metres (610 ft)
- Frozen: Winter
- Islands: 5
- Settlements: Yellowknife

Frame Lake is located in Yellowknife, Northwest Territories, Canada. It is an 84-hectare (210-acre) endorheic freshwater body located between the city's downtown section and a larger residential area. The Frame Lake Trail circles it, and city hall and the territorial legislative assembly building are on its shores.

Formed by meltwater after the end of the Wisconsin glaciation 20,000 years ago, Frame has been an important part of Yellowknife's history. The Dene in the area used it as a fishing spot before European settlement. In the early years of the city's growth, gold mines nearby dumped tailings in it and sometimes sewage. Later, when the city's New Town, now its downtown section, was surveyed and developed nearby, Frame offered accessible swimming and boating opportunities.

However, storm sewers diverted much of the runoff that fed it. Later development blocked the lake's only outflow, leaving it endorheic (Note: While the word "endorheic" has not been used to describe the lake, Woodall and Healey described it as having only seepage as its outflow, and later sources (such as Carleton) note that the 1970s construction of the causeway blocked the only outlet.) and complicating the problems caused by earlier pollution. By the early 1970s it no longer supported any fish; within two decades residents had stopped swimming or boating it out of fear of leeches. Subsequent studies have shown that the lake completely eutrophied sometime in the mid-1990s. They have not, however, been able to determine whether that was due to climate change, pollution or some combination of both; the possibility exists that the lake has always been at a higher trophic state than others in the area.

Some city residents have agitated for efforts to reclaim the lake so it will once again be a destination for swimmers, anglers and boaters in warm weather. To do so, it will be necessary to reoxygenate the water to the point that fish can again inhabit its waters. This could be accomplished either by aeration or dredging, which would remove the accumulated rotted organic matter on the lake bed that currently renders it anoxic when the lake is frozen over in the winter.

== Geography ==
Frame Lake is irregularly shaped, with a northern section and a southern section along a north-northeast to south-southwest axis approximately 1.4 kilometres (0.87 mi) long, connected by a narrower central passage midway along its length where a wide peninsula extends from the western shore and an arm extends roughly 500 metres (1,600 ft) to the east, curving northward. At their widest shorelines, both sections are roughly the same distance apart. Five small islands are located within the lake, three in the northern section and two in the southern section. Its total surface area is 84 hectares (210 acres).

The lake lies at an elevation of 186 metres (610 ft). Surrounding terrain is gently undulating, with some of the small hills nearby cresting as high as 207 metres (679 ft) and one of the islands rising to 197 metres (646 ft). Two unnamed streams drain into the lake south of the peninsula on the western side. The northerly of the two rises from drainage ditches surrounding the runways at Yellowknife Airport 1.6 kilometres (1.0 mi) to the west, draining Robinson's Pond on the way to Frame Lake; the southerly has largely been channelized, draining Range Lake 600 metres (2,000 ft) to the west, itself fed by a stream of similarly short length flowing into it from the west.

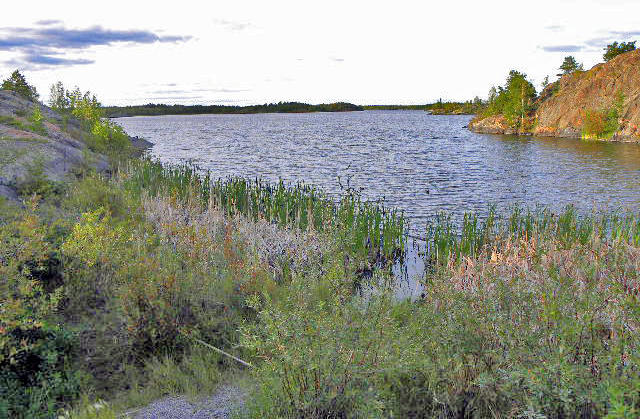
Weeds and exposed rock on the shoreline

Surrounding terrain, as well as that of the islands, is primarily taiga forest, amid mostly bare outcrops of Canadian Shield bedrock typical of the Yellowknife area. Bare rock predominates on the shoreline, except for some shallow bays with weed beds. On the eastern shore, near the southern end of the lake, is an overgrown sandy area called McNiven Beach, after the city's first mayor.

The developed areas of Yellowknife form a "V" around the lake. On the eastern side, and the southern shore of the arm, is New Town, the city's modern downtown. Public buildings such as City Hall, the Royal Canadian Mounted Police's local headquarters, and the Canadian Forces Northern Area Headquarters Yellowknife are situated along the south side of the arm, their associated lawns coming almost to the edge of the lake.

South of City Hall along the lake shore is Somba K'e Park, open space with the only totally developed portion of shoreline. Beyond it, the taiga and bedrock buffer the lake from the city, except for the dead end of residential Matonabee Road. The Frame Lake Trail, a partially paved pathway 5.5 kilometres (3.4 mi) in length, closely follows the shoreline past an extensive area of forest. Just south of McNiven Beach is a recreational facility with an arena and pool, again close to the water's edge.

At the south end, another residential neighborhood comes near the lake, after which a rocky area buffers Stanton Regional Hospital. Commercial strip development along Old Airport Road also comes close, and the road itself runs alongside part of the lake's southwestern shore for 100 metres (330 ft). After it curves away to the west, the northwestern side and northern end of the lake are all taiga and bedrock between Frame and nearby Robinson's Pond and Jackfish Lake, with just the trail alongside.

Amid a park-like setting on the northeastern corner of the lake, and the northern shore of the western arm, stand two other large public buildings: the Prince of Wales Northern Heritage Centre and Northwest Territories Legislative Assembly Building. The two are connected via paths and driveways through the intervening taiga and bedrock. A causeway carries the Frame Lake Trail across the tip of the arm, where the Northern Frontier Visitor Centre overlooks the lake.

== History ==
Formed by the retreat of the glaciers at the end of the last Ice Age, Frame Lake remained a relatively pure lake even as the area was settled and modern development impinged on it. The closure of its only outlet around 1970, however, led swiftly to its decline and eutrophication. By the end of the 20th century it could no longer support fish and was not being used for primary recreational purposes. Attempts to revive it started in the 2010s.

=== Prehistory–1934: Before European settlement ===
Like many of the lakes in the Northwest Territories (NWT), Frame is glacial in origin. During the Wisconsin Glaciation, the last ice age, glaciers covered almost all of today's Western Canada. As they retreated about 20,000 years ago, they left large lakes of meltwater behind. One, known today as Lake McConnell, covered almost all of the western NWT as well as adjacent regions of what is now Alberta and Saskatchewan. By 8,000 years ago, it had drained and evaporated to the point that only small remnants were left, such as Athabasca, Great Bear and Great Slave Lakes. Along with those larger lakes were smaller lakes like Frame, where fine sand that accumulated in depressions formed the lake bed.

Human use of the lake began with the Dene, the First Nations in the region, whose ancestors settled there around 7,500 years ago. The Yellowknife band, who would later give their name to the city, found the lake abundant with pike, suckers and whitefish. While they did not settle on its shores, they established a fishing camp there.

=== 1934–1992: Growth years and lake decline ===
The descendants of European settlers began coming to the area of the lake in the early 20th century, first using it as a staging area for bush pilots flying to mining camps and settlements further north. In the mid-1930s, abundant gold deposits in the area triggered the establishment of Yellowknife as a permanent settlement. While at the time development was concentrated on the peninsula extending into Great Slave Lake's Yellowknife Bay, an area known today as Old Town, later analysis of lake sediments lends some support to accounts from that time of Frame Lake being used for the disposal of tailings and sewage from outlying mines. The lake took its name from Bill Frame, an early miner who owned part of the city's bus and taxi franchise.

External image
- 1967 picture of swimming facilities at McNiven Beach

Yellowknife's growth was briefly interrupted by World War II, but when it resumed afterwards, the higher ground closer to the lake was chosen for expansion. The area just east of the lake became New Town, today the city's downtown. McNiven Beach, named after the city's first mayor, was developed with facilities for swimming; sometimes floatplanes landed nearby as well. Residents also went boating on the lake.

At the same time, runoff from storms carried increasingly nutrient-rich waters into the lake. In colder months when the lake surface was not frozen over, the city dumped plowed snow into the lake, adding even more nutrients. Sewage dumped into nearby Niven Lake, heavily used for that purpose for almost 35 years of Yellowknife's postwar growth, may also have flowed into Frame, offering more nutrients.

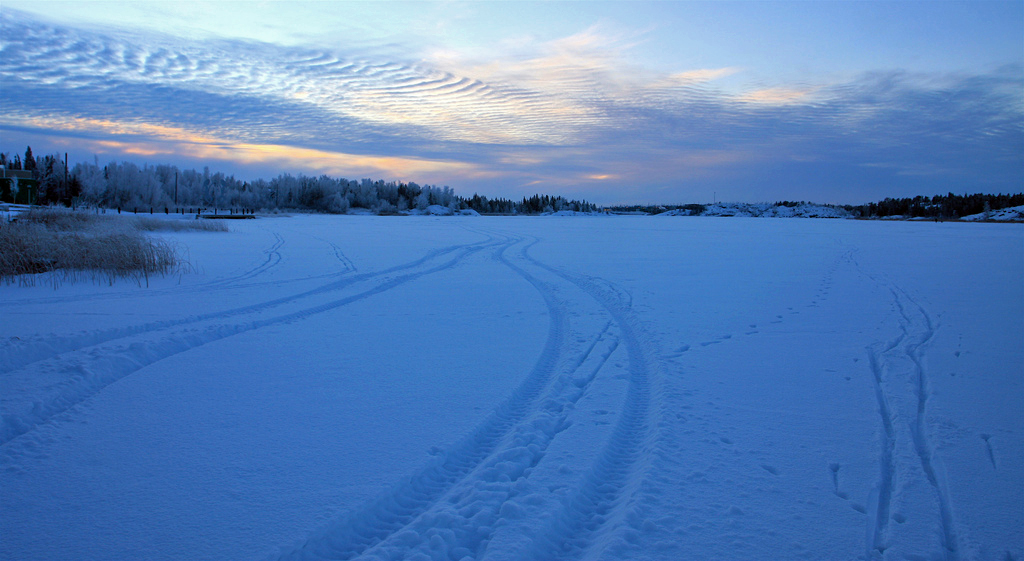
The lake freezes over in the winter, limiting light available for photosynthesis.

By the early 1970s the lake's decline had been noted. A later study by the earth science department at Carleton University concluded that the 1970 construction of the causeway across the end of the lake's eastern arm was the "tipping point" for Frame Lake. It cut off the stream between it and Niven Lake to the north, the only outlet the lake had had during human habitation of the area. With the lack of water throughput, nutrient levels in the water column rose, nurturing aquatic plants during the summertime. In the winter, however, when the lake froze over and snow cover blocked much of the limited sunlight available, (Note: Due to its high northern latitude, Yellowknife receives as little as four hours of daylight during the weeks around the winter solstice.) those same plants died off for lack of ability to photosynthesize. The decomposed plant matter began accumulating on the lake floor, steadily deoxygenating its waters.

In a 1973 limnological study of seven lakes in the Yellowknife area, including Frame, for a possible experimental fishery, scientists from the Fisheries Research Board noted that Frame was the only one in which they were unable to catch any fish for study. Over the preceding winter, they also observed that the lake had "become rapidly anoxic".

As the lake declined, development came closer. Yellowknife built its current city hall by the lake edge in 1975, and the Prince of Wales Northern Heritage Centre, the territorial museum, followed nearby four years later. Sometime later that decade, the number of swimmers at McNiven Beach declined sufficiently for the city to remove the facilities there, as the beach itself began to grow over with grass.

Residents were still swimming and boating in the lake in the early 1980s, but in smaller numbers. Some were scared off by reports of leeches that had in one instance supposedly covered an entire child. A local journalist recalled in 2015 how he had had to watch his step to avoid deep, malodorous deposits while catching tadpoles in the shallow waters near his home at that time. Later the Frame Lake South area was developed for residential and commercial use as the city grew. Storm sewers installed for these projects diverted the runoff that had once fed the lake, increasing the concentration of nutrients in the water.

=== 1993–present: Reclamation attempts ===
The Northwest Territories Legislative Assembly moved into its new building, designed to preserve as much of the original shoreline and vegetation as possible, on the north shore of the lake in 1993. By then, all recreational use of the lake itself had ended. Many residents were too leery of leeches, which thrived in the lake in the absence of fish preying on them, to enter the water. Instead, the lake became the focus of the 5.5-kilometre (3.4 mi) Frame Lake Trail, a partially paved path around the entire shoreline, which soon became popular for walking and jogging.

In 2007, a conservation report prepared for the city named Frame Lake its top priority and suggested enacting special nature-preservation zoning to protect it. During the following decade, residents began to rediscover Frame Lake. "As a city, we've largely disengaged from this little jewel in our midst", wrote Matthew Mallon in YK_Edge, a local weekly newspaper. Newer residents, he said, were incredulous at his recollections of swimming and sailing on the lake in his childhood. In 2013 another local resident organized a Canada Day cleanup and swim in the lake, saying concerns about arsenic and leeches in the water were exaggerated.

The Carleton study carried out under a grant from Tides Canada and the Royal Bank of Canada in 2015 established that the lake had declined more precipitously since 1970, and described how. It will continue to measure the degradation of the lake on an annual basis to form a basis for policy recommendations to revitalize the lake. Currently researchers believe that either dredging rotten sediments off the lake bottom or aeration would best restore the water quality of the lake's early years.

== Geology ==
The lake is mostly underlain by a mix of volcanic and plutonic igneous rock. Most of it is the same Archean basalt greenstone belt that predominates in the Yellowknife area. Running through the central portion from north northeast, under the heritage centre and Legislative Assembly building, to south southwest is a narrow belt of dacite flanked by two gabbro sills (one of which forms the largest island), with some more dacite under the visitor's centre and the southern of the two points of the western peninsula. Small diabase dykes run through various portions of the bedrock, with the largest forming the elevated area at the lake's southeast corner. Quartz intrusions are visible in some areas.

Two local faults run across the south end of the lake. The stream from Robinson's Pond runs along the Pud Fault, which continues across the lakebed to McNiven Beach. At the south end is the larger Kam Fault, which when it was active had the same potential for earthquakes as the San Andreas Fault in the U.S. state of California. It divides the basalt from an area of lighter granite and granodiorite between the lake and the hospital.

There are also visible signs of the lake's glacial origins. Just south of Somba K'e Park on the east shore, the rock has striations and scour marks in the northeast-to-southwest direction of the glaciers' advance. The fine sand on the lake bed is also glacial residue. In some areas around the lake edge, the ground is underlain by permafrost at an average depth of 15 metres (49 ft).

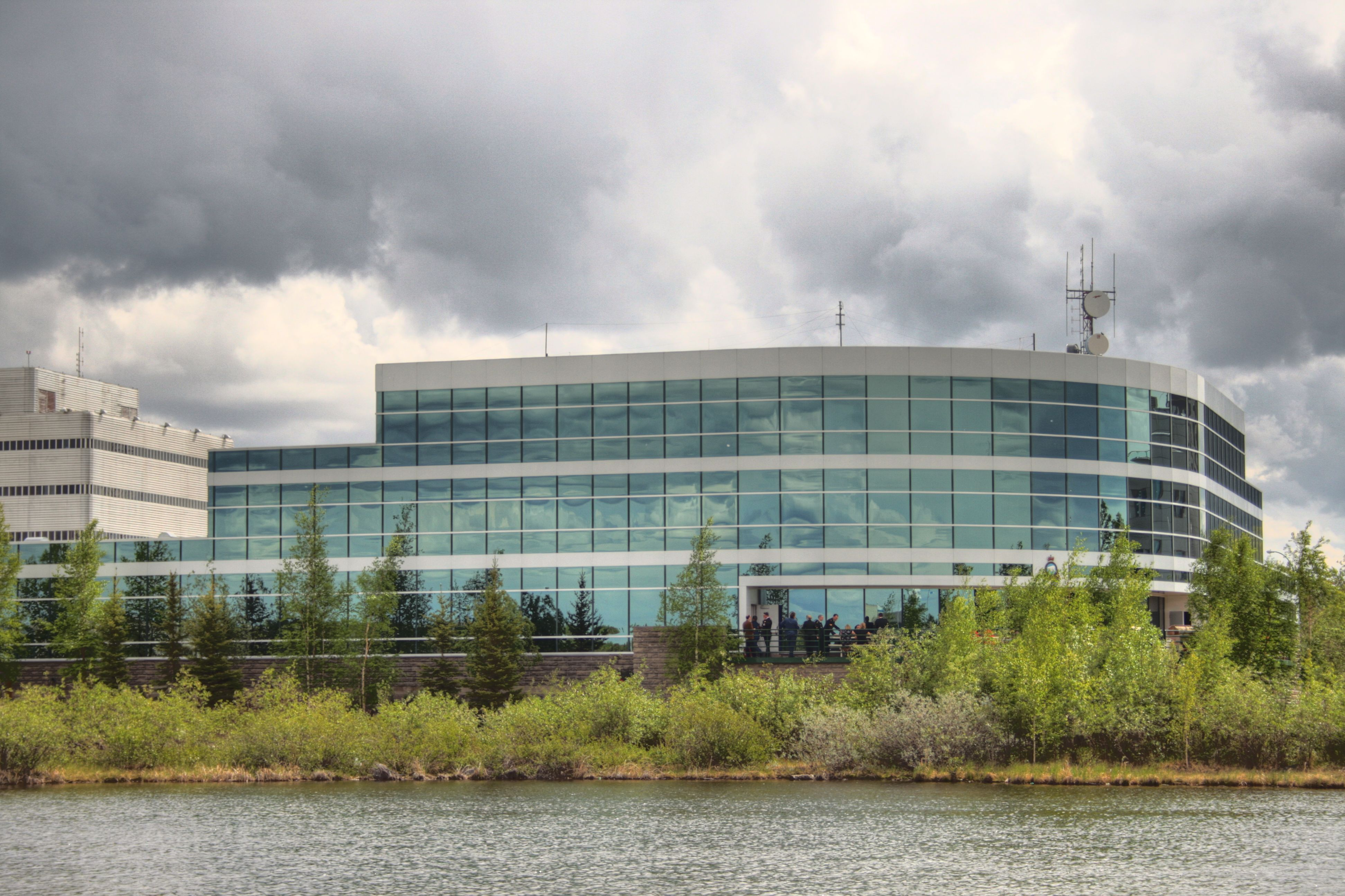
Bedrock below the military headquarters building is not at a uniform depth.

Where soil exists around the lake, it is mostly silt and clay as opposed to the sand of neighboring New Town. It does not support buildings well, nor does it give way to bedrock at a uniform depth. The military building and visitor's centre both encountered construction difficulties due to this.

== Hydrology ==
There have been two significant periods of study on Frame Lake. One, in the early 1970s, looked at its water. The others, in the mid-2010s, examined the sediments to determine how the lake had reached the point it had by then.

=== 1970s study ===
In 1971, just after what a later study would identify as the point when the lake's eutrophication began in earnest, M.C. Healey and W.L. Woodall, two researchers from the Fisheries Research Board of Canada, considered Frame in a limnological study of seven lakes in and around Yellowknife that their agency was considering as sites for an experimental fishery. Among the others studied were the larger Kam Lake to the south, and five others outside city limits. Their analysis, published in 1973, showed that while Frame's water quality was still good enough to support the recreational use that was still occurring, there were already some signs of decline.

Chemical analysis of the water showed similarities to Kam Lake. Like the larger lake, it had a notably alkaline pH of 8.5, reflecting higher concentrations of salts, and a specific conductance of 332, well below Kam but around three times the values obtained for the other four lakes. Its calcium, magnesium, potassium, and sodium levels were higher than any other lake except Kam, and it had the highest bicarbonate levels at 132.4 mg/L. The lake was found to be generally isothermal, although its depths cooled significantly in August, when the later of two samples was taken. Plenty of oxygen was still in the water. The researchers attributed Frame's high biochemical oxygen demand and "peculiar chemical characteristics" to not only the proximity of downtown but the city's use of the lake as a dump for plowed snow.

"Frame Lake had the most peculiar species assemblage for the region", the two wrote of the results of their zooplankton findings. Daphnia middendoffiana, the only Cladocera species found in Frame, was present in only that lake of the seven. Likewise, several copepods—Heterecope sententrionalis and Diaptomus pribilofensis and leptopus—were unique to Frame. Cyclops vernalis was the only species the lake shared with any of the others. "The species in Frame Lake are typical of a lake west of the continental divide, in Alaska or northern British Columbia, but extremely uncommon east of the divide", they observed.

Benthos species in Frame were more similar to the other lakes. Frame shared with the other lakes a high mollusk population, predominantly in the Sphaeriidae and Valvatidae families. Lymnaeidae were unique to it, however. Insect populations around the lake are dominated by non-biting midges, especially the Chironominae and Tanypodinae subfamilies. Healey and Woodall also found significant populations of mayflies, damselflies, and water boatmen in the lake.

They did not find any fish, the only one of the seven lakes where this was the case. Frame nevertheless recorded the highest biomass count of the seven lakes, 7.32 grams of dry weight per square meter of bed, more than three times the second highest reading, on the second of two sampling periods in summer 1971. At the same time, that biomass had the lowest ash content of any of the sampled lakes as well.

=== 2010s studies ===
Healey and Woodall were not able to analyze any sediments underneath more than one meter (3.3 ft) of water because the particles were too fine for the Ekman dredge sifter that they used. In 2013 Sarah Shenstone-Harris, a recent Queen's University graduate interning at the University of Toronto's Centre for Global Change Science, was able to analyze the sediments. She looked to the diatoms in them to try to see if climate change had played a role in the lake's decline. If so, she also asked, when did that change occur, and was it possible to restore the lake to a level of water quality comparable to what it had been prior to the establishment of Yellowknife?

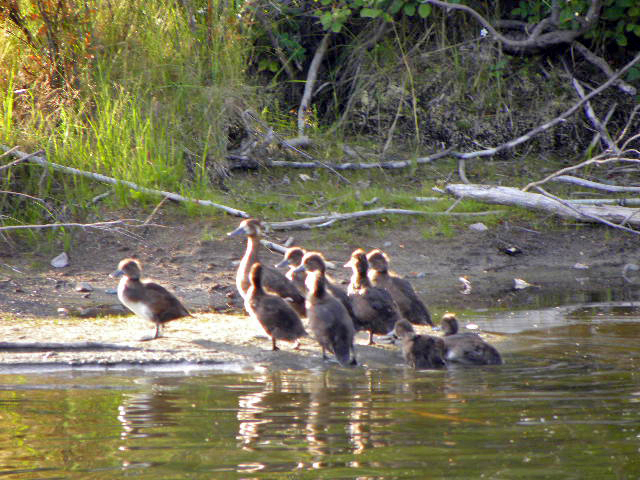
Ducks on the lakeshore, 2011

Shenstone-Harris started from the observation that subarctic lakes generally had shown great sensitivity to climate change because of shifts in the amount of ice cover. Those stresses could be exacerbated for subarctic lakes in an urban area facing higher levels of pollution from a number of different sources, such as Frame. Her inquiry was a paleolimnological one, focusing on the algae species present in the lake at various times in the recent past. She took core samples of the sediment down to 17 centimetres (6.7 in) and dated them by the lead-210 levels. Once their age was established, she looked at the diatom remains, since the species of algae in the water can reflect environmental changes, and counted the ratio of chrysophyte stomatocysts to establish nutrient levels in the water at that time.

Due to diatom dissolution at the lowest level of the sediments taken, Shenstone-Harris was unable to establish data for any years earlier than 1943, making it impossible to set the desired baseline for a pre-settlement Frame Lake. However, she was able to establish that the lake had always been at a high trophic state, even before it became fully eutrophied by the mid- to late-1990s. That was preceded by a rapid replacement of epiphytic species with benthic ones around 1990.

It was not clear to Shenstone-Harris that that event had been the result of climate change. From 1956 to 1992, the last year records were kept, ice cover on the lake remained relatively stable throughout the winter, yet the amount of Cyclotella and Fragliaria, two genera whose species have been shown to be responsive to changing ice cover and warming climates, varied considerably. This suggested to her that while climate change may be a factor in the lake's decline, it is not the only one. Instead, the change in species around 1990 pointed to a change in littoral zone microhabitat, a loss of macrophytes and mosses, as bearing the primary responsibility for tipping the lake to its present eutrophic state. However, the lack of data on ice cover since 1992 and her inability to determine the lake's status prior to the establishment of Yellowknife qualified that conclusion. "Alternatively", she wrote, "Frame Lake may be a subarctic anomaly and was always high in nutrients".

In 2015 the Carleton team was able to examine the sediments. They found that the period between the late 1940s and 1970 added a half-meter (20 in) of sediment to the bottom of the lake, the most of any lake in the region. Above it, the 10 centimetres (3.9 in) of sediment postdating the causeway was "black, sulfurous smelling and characterized by very high levels of metals, particularly arsenic". These are consistent with the patches of sediment Mallon recalled from his youthful recreation on the lake in his 2015 article, noting that "I can still vividly feel the stuff's gloopy embrace on my feet" (although an accompanying sidebar by another reporter suggested that the sediments may be the result of sewage back-flushed from Niven Lake).

== See also ==
- List of endorheic basins
- List of lakes of the Northwest Territories
