= Microsoft SQL Server Master Data Services =

Microsoft SQL Server Master Data Services (MDS) is a Master Data Management (MDM) product from Microsoft that ships as a part of the Microsoft SQL Server relational database management system. Master data management (MDM) allows an organization to discover and define non-transactional lists of data, and compile maintainable, reliable master lists. Master Data Services first shipped with Microsoft SQL Server 2008 R2. Microsoft SQL Server 2016 introduced enhancements to Master Data Services, such as improved performance and security, and the ability to clear transaction logs, create custom indexes, share entity data between different models, and support for many-to-many relationships.

== Overview ==
In Master Data Services, the model is the highest level container in the structure of your master data. You create a model to manage groups of similar data. A model contains one or more entities, and entities contain members that are the data records. An entity is similar to a table.

Like other MDM products, Master Data Services aims to create a centralized data source and keep it synchronized, and thus reduce redundancies, across the applications which process the data.

Sharing the architectural core with Stratature +EDM, Master Data Services uses a Microsoft SQL Server database as the physical data store. It is a part of the Master Data Hub, which uses the database to store and manage data entities. It is a database with the software to validate and manage the data, and keep it synchronized with the systems that use the data. The master data hub has to extract the data from the source system, validate, sanitize and shape the data, remove duplicates, and update the hub repositories, as well as synchronize the external sources. The entity schemas, attributes, data hierarchies, validation rules and access control information are specified as metadata to the Master Data Services runtime. Master Data Services does not impose any limitation on the data model. Master Data Services also allows custom Business rules, used for validating and sanitizing the data entering the data hub, to be defined, which is then run against the data matching the specified criteria. All changes made to the data are validated against the rules, and a log of the transaction is stored persistently. Violations are logged separately, and optionally the owner is notified, automatically. All the data entities can be versioned.

Master Data Services allows the master data to be categorized by hierarchical relationships, such as employee data are a subtype of organization data. Hierarchies are generated by relating data attributes. Data can be automatically categorized using rules, and the categories are introspected programmatically. Master Data Services can also expose the data as Microsoft SQL Server views, which can be pulled by any SQL-compatible client. It uses a role-based access control system to restrict access to the data. The views are generated dynamically, so they contain the latest data entities in the master hub. It can also push out the data by writing to some external journals. Master Data Services also includes a web-based UI for viewing and managing the data. It uses ASP.NET in the back-end. The Silverlight front-end was replaced with HTML5 in SQL Server 2019.

Master Data Services provides a Web service interface to expose the data, as well as an API, which internally uses the exposed web services, exposing the feature set, programmatically, to access and manipulate the data. It also integrates with Active Directory for authentication purposes. Unlike +EDM, Master Data Services supports Unicode characters, as well as support multilingual user interfaces.

SQL Server 2016 introduced a significant performance increase in Master Data Services over previous versions.

== Terminology ==
- Model is the highest level of an MDS instance. It is the primary container for specific groupings of master data. In many ways it is very similar to the idea of a database.
- Entities are containers created within a model. Entities provide a home for members, and are in many ways analogous to database tables. (e.g. Customer)
- Members are analogous to the records in a database table (Entity) e.g. Will Smith. Members are contained within entities. Each member is made up of two or more attributes.
- Attributes are analogous to the columns within a database table (Entity) e.g. Surname. Attributes exist within entities and help describe members (the records within the table). Name and Code attributes are created by default for each entity and serve to describe and uniquely identify leaf members. Attributes can be related to other attributes from other entities which are called 'domain-based' attributes. This is similar to the concept of a foreign key.

Other attributes however, will be of type 'free-form' (most common) or 'file'.

- Attribute Groups are explicitly defined collections of particular attributes. Say you have an entity "customer" that has 50 attributes — too much information for many of your users. Attribute groups enable the creation of custom sets of hand-picked attributes that are relevant for specific audiences. (e.g. "customer - delivery details" that would include just their name and last known delivery address). This is very similar to a database view.
- Hierarchies organize members into either Derived or Explicit hierarchical structures. Derived hierarchies, as the name suggests, are derived by the MDS engine based on the relationships that exist between attributes. Explicit hierarchies are created by hand using both leaf and consolidated members.
- Business Rules can be created and applied against model data to ensure that custom business logic is adhered to. In order to be committed into the system data must pass all business rule validations applied to them. e.g. Within the Customer Entity you may want to create a business rule that ensures all members of the 'Country' Attribute contain either the text "USA" or "Canada". The Business Rule once created and ran will then verify all the data is correct before it accepts it into the approved model.
- Versions provide system owners / administrators with the ability to Open, Lock or Commit a particular version of a model and the data contained within it at a particular point in time. As the content within a model varies, grows or shrinks over time versions provide a way of managing metadata so that subscribing systems can access to the correct content.
