= Northwest Territories Legislative Building =

Government of the Northwest Territories of Canada in Yellowknife

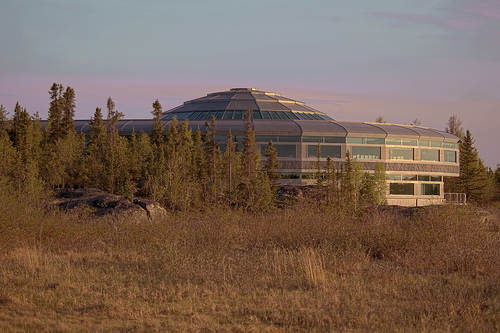
- Northwest Territories Legislative Building

- Location within Canada

General information
- Architectural style: Postmodern
- Location: 4570 48th Street; Box 1320; Yellowknife, Northwest Territories; X1A 2L9
- Coordinates: 62°27′34″N 114°22′55″W
- Completed: 1993
- Inaugurated: 1994
- Client: Legislative Assembly of the Northwest Territories
- Owner: Government of the Northwest Territories

Technical details
- Floor count: 2

Design and construction
- Architect: Matsuzaki Wright Architects Inc. in association with Ferguson Simek Clark/Pin Matthews

The Northwest Territories Legislative Building is the home of the Legislative Assembly of the Northwest Territories, in Yellowknife, Northwest Territories. The territory's legislature has used many permanent and temporary facilities throughout its history. The most recent structure was built in 1993 and commenced usage in 1994, being officially opened that year by Canada's monarch, Queen Elizabeth II. Designed by Ferguson Simek Clark/Pin Matthews (of Yellowknife), in association with Matsuzaki Wright Architects Inc (of Vancouver), the building is two stories tall and contains two round halls: the Great Hall and the Caucus Room. The grounds, overlooking Frame Lake, were laid out by Cornelia Oberlander.

== Previous locations ==
=== Early Government House ===
The North-West Council was first housed in the Early Government House building in Fort Garry, originally built for the provisional government of Louis Riel. The building was the official residence of the Manitoba lieutenant governor and was used until 1883, when the lieutenant governor moved into newer quarters.

=== Swan River Barracks ===
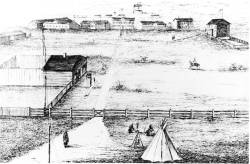
Sketch of Fort Livingstone circa 1877, with the Swan River Barracks visible at top, centre

The Northwest Territories government moved to Fort Livingstone in 1876. Legislative sessions were held inside the Swan River Barracks which operated and housed the North-West Mounted Police. The Barracks were built two years earlier in 1874, and destroyed by a wild fire long after the Government left in 1884. In addition to serving the Government, the Barracks served as living quarters for 185 men and their horses.

=== NWT Government House, Battleford ===
The NWT Government House in Battleford was the first building designed for the Northwest Territories Legislative Assembly. It was used for sessions from 1877 to 1883. The building also served as residence for the Lieutenant Governor who had to preside over Assembly sessions and the Executive council. The building was destroyed by fire in 2003.

=== Territorial Administration Building, Regina ===
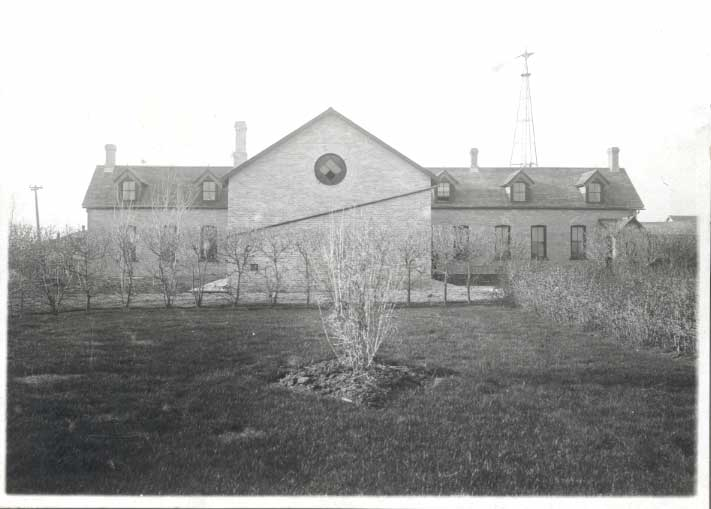
Territorial Administration Building, Dewdney Avenue, circa 1915; legislative chamber in foreground

The Territorial Government buildings in Regina, dating from 1883, consisted of the Legislative Building, the Administration Building and the Indian Office and were designed by the Dominion architect, Thomas Fuller. The mansard roofed Administration Building remains standing. After the North-West Territories Legislature was moved to Ottawa in 1905, the building housed the Legislative Assembly of Saskatchewan until 1910. In 1922 the building was partially destroyed by fire; the Saskatchewan government repaired the building and leased it to the Salvation Army until 1971. The building was fully restored and made a heritage site in 1979.

=== Ottawa ===
After the Legislative Assembly was dissolved in 1905 the government operated out of an office building on Sparks Street in Ottawa.

=== Yellowknife Inn ===
In 1985, the Assembly was meeting in a temporary space at the Yellowknife Inn.

==== Stolen bear skin ====
One night in early August, the polar bear hide that decorated the table was taken. It had been on loan from the Hudson's Bay Company collection in Winnipeg. The thief or thieves left behind the narwhal tusk that was left atop it, as well as other beaver and seal pelts on the walls, suggesting the bear hide had been the target of the theft.

The hide was valued at CAN$10,000–15,000 at that time (CAN$26,000–39,000 in current dollars). The legislative assembly was taken by surprise. Despite extensive coverage in the local media, it was never recovered.

During that time, the public was allowed to tour the legislative spaces, including the meeting room, with guides. The doors were locked at night, but security was otherwise minimal. Former assembly speaker and territorial commissioner Anthony Whitford believes that the thieves may have posed as workmen to take it, since the chamber's decorations were often packed up and put away between assembly sessions. "It may have been a crime of opportunity", he observed.

Since no leads ever emerged, Whitford believes it was taken out of the territory. Too many people in Yellowknife knew each other, he told Up Here in 2019, for no one to have seen it or talked about it if it had been kept in the city somewhere. "Because surely by now, all those years have gone by, it would have surfaced", he said. "I mean it's no good if you don’t show it off!"

When the current building opened in 1993, Ludy Pudluk, then MLA for the High Arctic, donated a replacement, the one currently on display. Several of its claws have had to be replaced by a taxidermist, but it is otherwise intact.

== Current building ==
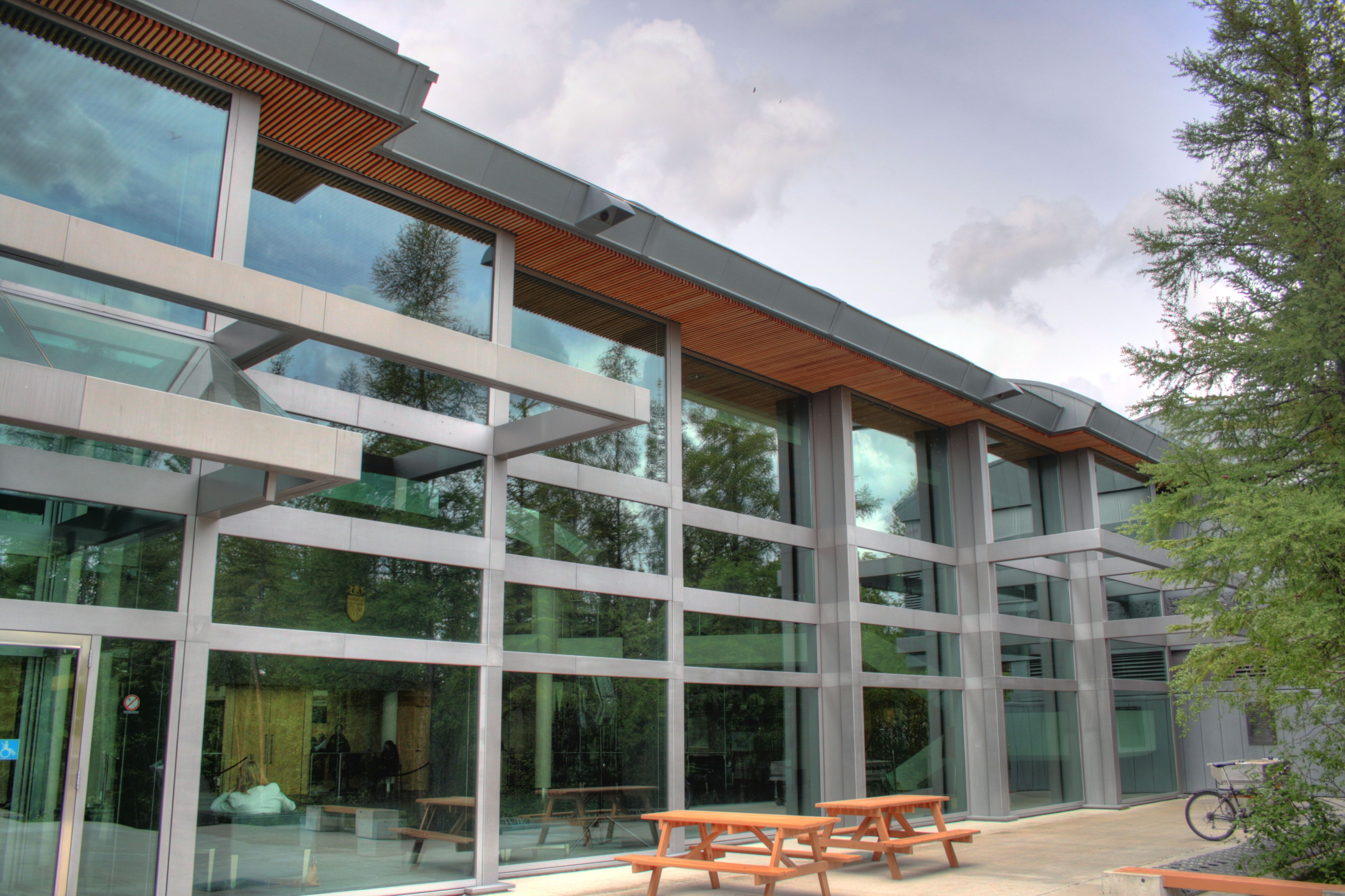
Main entry to the Legislative Assembly Building

The new Legislative Assembly Building in Yellowknife was completed in 1993. It was the first building specifically built for the needs of the assembly since the Territorial Administration Building in Regina. It was designed with themes from the local native populations and for a 100-year-plus life span. Elizabeth II, Queen of Canada, with her consort, Prince Philip, Duke of Edinburgh, opened the legislative building on 21 August 1994.

Sited directly on the shore of Frame Lake, the structure is nestled between outcroppings of the Canadian Shield, a natural peat bog, and large stands of existing trees. Natural materials were used extensively, including zinc panels, maple ceiling and panels, and slate floors. The exterior cladding is zinc, an economically significant material mined in the Territories. The curved roof edges provide a finished appearance for airplane passengers taking off/landing at the nearby main airport across the lake, in addition to its airplane-wing shape helping to wind-scour snow from the roof to avoid ice and water damage.

The Great Hall has floor-to-ceiling windows facing directly into the treed forecourt allowing the natural slate floor appear to merge the inside with the outside. Special consideration was given to maximizing natural light to all of the main spaces and offices. Opening vent panels in each member's office provides user control of fresh air and an environment suited for people who may not be accustomed to spending days in an air-conditioned office building.

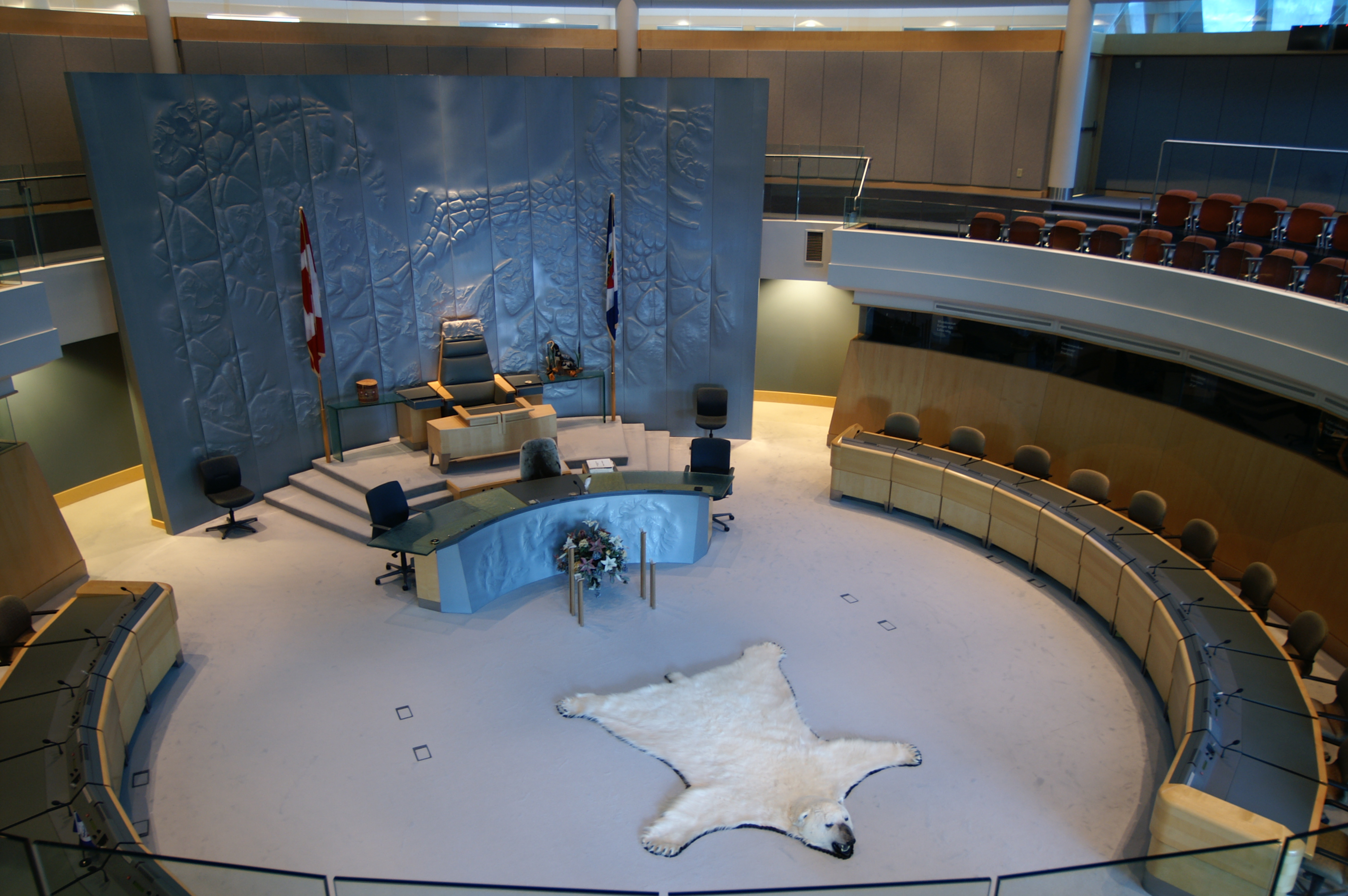
The Chamber

The Chamber and Caucus Room are circular to support the consensus-style government. Translation booths surround the chamber for translators to provide simultaneous translation of the territories' 11 official languages for all Members. Skylights ring the Chamber and Caucus Room as sunlight and daylight come from 360 degrees during the summer. The wall behind the Speaker is of hand-tooled zinc which mimics nearby rock formations. The stand in front of the Speaker's chair is for the parliamentary mace which, in addition to indicating the authority of the Crown, incorporates ivory walrus tusks and wood from the ill-fated ships of the 1845 Franklin expedition.

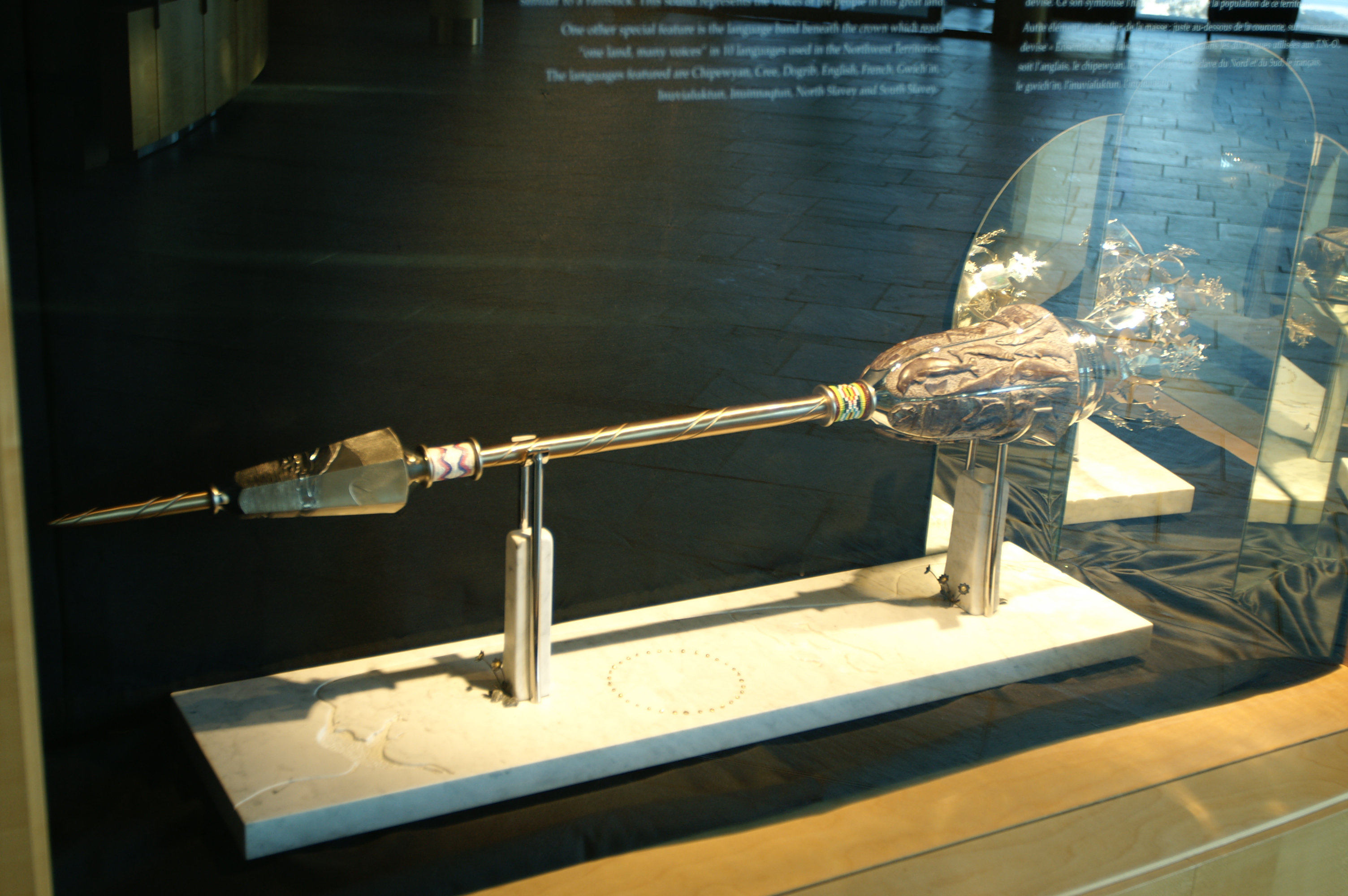
The Mace of the Legislative Assembly

Construction was undertaken using a fast-track method to meet critical construction and opening deadlines. Major construction materials needed to be brought north to Yellowknife, including by ferry in the summer and ice roads in the winter. During spring thaw and fall freeze-up neither was accessible. The steel structure therefore had to be erected during the winter which meant almost no welding was possible and most connections had to be bolted.

Careful attention was given to preserving and restoring the landscape, which involved careful protection of existing trees which were only 3 m (10 feet) from the exterior walls. Native plants were harvested and propagated in "The South", where growing seasons are longer, then returned to the site for restoration of the lakeshore and peat bog. The services annex for the building also has a planted roof which lessens the reduction in natural planted area by the building's footprint.
