= Operation Bulldog III =

- Part of the Cold War
- The Van Doos unloading during Operation Bulldog III
- Location: Yellowknife, Northwest Territories, Canada
- Objective: Mock invasion
- Date: February 23 – March 8, 1955
- Executed by: Canadian Army

Operation Bulldog III was a military exercise held in 1955 by the Canadian Army at Yellowknife, Northwest Territories, Canada.

== Purpose ==
During the Cold War, Yellowknife Airport was a strategic point crucial to the defence of North America in the event of a Soviet invasion, as it was one of the few suitable landing spots for large aircraft in Canada's north, and was in close proximity to the Soviet Union.

== Planning ==
Recognizing this strategic importance, the Canadian Army conducted Operation Bulldog III as an exercise to prepare a response to armed invasion of Canada's north, and defend the airfield from foreign attack. Operations Bulldog I and II had taken place in other areas in Canada, predicated on similar scenarios. Operation Bulldog III was a mock invasion of Yellowknife Airport by soldiers of a battalion of the Royal 22^{e} Régiment (The Van Doos), with the defending force consisting of No.7 Company Canadian Rangers. The "Van Doos" from the 22nd were Regular Force soldiers, while the Rangers were part-time soldiers drawn from local hunters, trappers and prospectors.

Operation Bulldog III was designed to test the rangers' ability to hold off an invading army until conventional reinforcements could deploy to the area.

The 65 men in the Rangers were armed with Canadian-manufactured .303 Lee–Enfield rifles, and Bren light machine guns. The exercise was conducted from February 23 to March 8, 1955.

== Exercise ==
The No. 7 Company Canadian Rangers were led by John Anderson-Thompson, a commissioned officer and veteran of the First and Second World Wars. Anderson-Thompson replaced many of his office workers and store clerks with trappers, prospectors, hunters, and other outdoorsmen, as well as war veterans. He planned to hold the airport for as long as possible using delaying tactics until a force from Princess Patricia's Canadian Light Infantry from Calgary could parachute in.

In the fall of 1954, Anderson-Thomson was notified that the Department of National Defence would be putting on a refereed exercise, in which the rangers were to set up a defence and secure a drop zone that was free of enemies, so that Princess Patricia's paratroopers could land. Anderson-Thomson helped the No.7 Company Rangers to build machine gun nests around the airport, as well as a maze of snowshoe trails that would lead the enemy troops to carefully placed machine gun nests. The Van Doos expected these traps, but not Yellowknife's own air force.

On the morning of the invasion, several members of the rangers who owned airplanes were cruising around in the sky. Just as the Van Doos had finished unloading and deplaning, they swooped in and began their bombing run, dropping small bags filled with lamp black as their "bombs". The fine carbon powder got into everything the Van Doos had, including their tents, sleeping bags, and rations. The "bombing" was so successful that if real bombs had been used, the whole invading force would have been wiped out. The umpires supervising the operation declared that the rangers had won their first battle.

When the exercise resumed shortly after that, the rangers decimated the soot-covered Van Doos - who were clearly visible against the white snow - from their hidden machine gun nests. The umpires announced the rangers the victors of the second battle. The rangers were so successful that the umpires ordered them to retreat beyond the airport road, so that the Van Doos could finish unloading and set up camp. When the Van Doos were ready, the exercise was restarted, and the Van Doos were making their way slowly to the airport road when the Royal Yellowknife Air Force (RYAF) struck again. A pilot in a Stinson bush plane was in the process of pulling down the Van Doos radio antenna with his wheels, when he saw three of the Van Doos in a huddle and dropped a bag of lamp black on them. One of the people in the huddle was the Van Doos commanding officer, so they were now without a leader and without communications equipment, leading to the rangers' third win in as many hours. The umpires evened the odds by grounding the RYAF, declaring John Anderson-Thomson a casualty, and making the rangers retreat even further away from the airport, telling them to prepare for a night attack, which was also declared as a victory for the rangers.

For the final exercise, the rangers were told to secure an enemy-free zone on Back Bay for Princess Patricia's paratroopers to land. Once they landed, they followed 5 km of trail that was built by the rangers back to the airport without the Van Doos knowing they were there. Their short assault on Yellowknife Airport was successful, meaning the rangers finished Operation Bulldog III with victories in all five exercises against the best army troop in Canada.
