= Outline of the Northwest Territories =

The following outline is provided as an overview of and topical guide to the Northwest Territories:

Flag of the Northwest Territories

Coat of arms of the Northwest Territories

The Northwest Territories – The Northwest Territories is a federal territory of Canada. At a land area of approximately 1,144,000 km^{2} (442,000 mi^{2}) and a 2016 census population of 41,786, it is the second-largest and the most populous of the three territories in Northern Canada. Its estimated population as of 2018 is 44,445.

The Northwest Territories is bordered by Canada's two other territories, Nunavut to the east and Yukon to the west, and by the provinces of British Columbia, Alberta, and Saskatchewan to the south.

== General reference ==
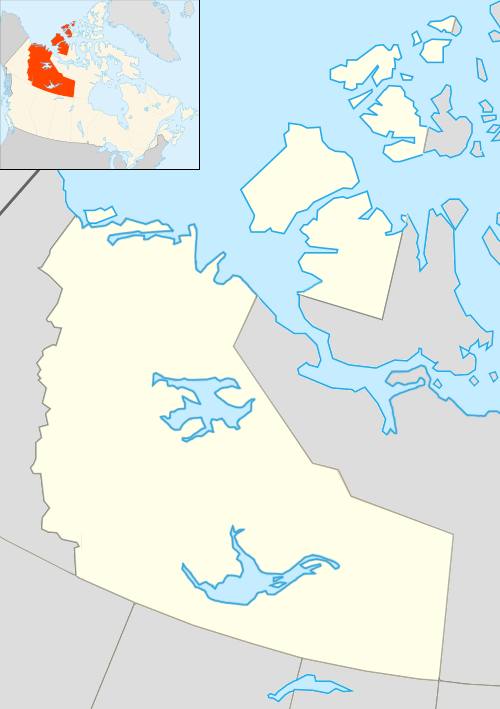
Location of the Northwest Territories

- Alternate name(s):
  - les Territoires du Nord-Ouest (French)
  - Denendeh (Athabaskan languages)
  - Nunatsiaq (Inuinnaqtun)
  - ᓄᓇᑦᓯᐊᖅ (Inuktitut)
- Pronunciation:
- Adjectival(s): Northwest Territorian ("N.W.T.")
- Demonym(s): Northwest Territorian
- Postal code: X0, X1 (Yellowknife)

== History of the Northwest Territories ==
History of the Northwest Territories

- History of the North-Western Territory
  - List of lieutenant governors of the Northwest Territories
- History of Northwest Territories capital cities
  - Timeline of Yellowknife history
    - Yellowknife Historical Society
  - The Carrothers Commission

Districts of the Northwest Territories

Historic places in the Northwest Territories

- National Historic Sites in the Northwest Territories

== Geography of the Northwest Territories ==
Geography of Northwest Territories

- The Northwest Territories is: a territory in Northern Canada
- Population of the Northwest Territories: 41,786
- Area of the Northwest Territories: 1,143,793.86 km^{2}

=== Location ===
- the Northwest Territories is situated within the following regions:
- Time zone(s): UTC−7
- Highest point of the Northwest Territories

=== Environment of the Northwest Territories ===
Environment of Canada

- Climate of the Northwest Territories
  - Climate change in the Arctic
- Geology of the Northwest Territories
- Protected areas of the Northwest Territories
- Birds of the Northwest Territories

==== Ecology of the Northwest Territories ====
- Ecoregions in the Northwest Territories
- Arctic coastal tundra
- Brooks-British Range tundra
- Muskwa-Slave Lake forests
- Northern Canadian Shield taiga

==== Natural geographic features of the Northwest Territories ====
Landforms of Canada

- Islands of the Northwest Territories
- Lakes of the Northwest Territories
- Mountains of the Northwest Territories
- Volcanoes in the Northwest Territories
- Rivers of the Northwest Territories

Geology of the Northwest Territories

- Fossiliferous stratigraphic units in the Northwest Territories

World Heritage Sites in the Northwest Territories

=== Demography of the Northwest Territories ===
Demographics of Northwest Territories

- Census agglomeration of the Northwest Territories

== Government and politics of the Northwest Territories ==
Politics of the Northwest Territories

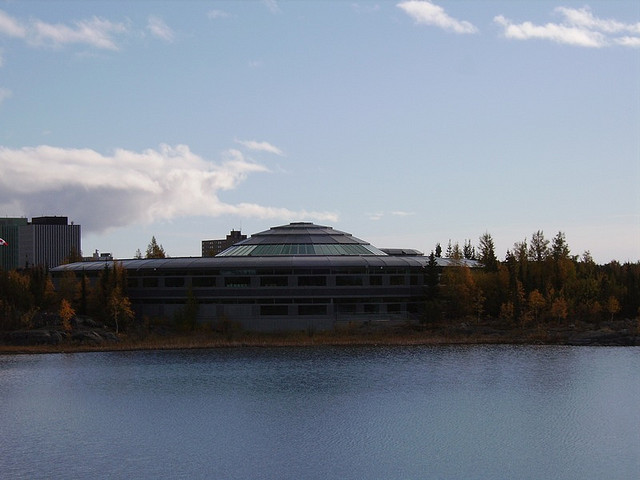
The Northwest Territories Legislative Building

- Form of government: territory
- Capital of the Northwest Territories: Yellowknife
- Elections in the Northwest Territories
- Political parties in the Northwest Territories: Consensus government
- Plebiscites in the Northwest Territories

=== Government of the Northwest Territories ===
Northwest Territories § Government

- Consensus government in Canada

==== Executive branch of the government of the Northwest Territories ====
- Head of state: Commissioner of the Northwest Territories
- Head of government: Premier of the Northwest Territories
  - List of premiers of the Northwest Territories
- Executive Council of the Northwest Territories

==== Legislative branch of the government of the Northwest Territories ====
- Legislative Assembly of the Northwest Territories (Unicameral)
  - Speaker of the Legislative Assembly of the Northwest Territories
  - List of Northwest Territories Legislative Assemblies
  - Capitol: Northwest Territories Legislative Building
- List of Canadian territorial senators

==== Other government establishments ====
- Liquor Licensing Board (Northwest Territories)
  - Cannabis in the Northwest Territories
- Northwest Territories Human Rights Commission
- Language Bureau of the Northwest Territories (defunct)

=== Judicial system of the Northwest Territories ===
Court system of Canada

- Territorial Court of the Northwest Territories (criminal and family court)
- Supreme Court of the Northwest Territories (trial court)
- Court of Appeal for the Northwest Territories

=== Local government in the Northwest Territories ===
==== Administrative divisions of the Northwest Territories ====
- Communities of the Northwest Territories
- Northwest Territories (electoral district)

=== Regions of the Northwest Territories ===
Regions of the Northwest Territories

==== Municipalities of the Northwest Territories ====
Municipalities of the Northwest Territories

- City in the Northwest Territories: Yellowknife
  - Mayor of Yellowknife
  - Yellowknife City Council
- Towns in the Northwest Territories
  - Ghost towns in the Northwest Territories
- Village in the Northwest Territories: Fort Simpson

== Culture of the Northwest Territories ==
Culture of the Northwest Territories

- Curling in the Northwest Territories
- Languages of the Northwest Territories
- Museums in the Northwest Territories
- Music of the Northwest Territories
- Order of the Northwest Territories
- Same-sex marriage in the Northwest Territories
- Symbols of the Northwest Territories
  - Coat of arms of the Northwest Territories
  - Flag of the Northwest Territories
  - Tartan of the Northwest Territories
- Scouting and Guiding in the Northwest Territories
- World Heritage Sites in the Northwest Territories
  - Nahanni National Park Reserve
  - Wood Buffalo National Park

=== Indigenous peoples of the Northwest Territories ===
Indigenous peoples in Northern Canada

== Economy and infrastructure of the Northwest Territories ==
Economy of the Northwest Territories

- Radio stations in the Northwest Territories
- Energy in the Northwest Territories
- Mining in the Northwest Territories

=== Transportation in the Northwest Territories ===
Northwest Territories § Transportation

- Airports in the Northwest Territories
- Airlines of the Northwest Territories
- Highways of the Northwest Territories
- Public transit of the Northwest Territories

== Education in the Northwest Territories ==
Education in Northwest Territories

- Schools in the Northwest Territories
  - List of Canadian primary and secondary examinations
  - Standardized testing in Alberta, Northwest Territories, and Nunavut
- School districts in the Northwest Territories

=== Higher education in the Northwest Territories ===
Higher education in the Northwest Territories

- Colleges in the Northwest Territories
  - Aurora College
  - Collège nordique francophone

== Bibliography ==
Bibliography of the Northwest Territories

== See also ==
- Outline of Canada
- Outline of geography
- List of Canada-related topics by provinces and territories
