= Human rights commission =

Independent body established to investigate, promote, or protect human rights

A human rights commission, also known as a human relations commission, is a body set up to investigate, promote or protect human rights.

The term may refer to international, national or subnational bodies set up for this purpose, such as national human rights institutions or (usually temporary) truth and reconciliation commissions.

== International ==
Region	Commission	Note
United Nations (Universal)	United Nations Human Rights Council	Replaced the United Nations Commission on Human Rights; distinct from the UN Human Rights Committee
African Union (Africa)	African Commission on Human and Peoples' Rights	
Organisation of American States (Americas)	Inter-American Commission on Human Rights	
Asia	ASEAN Intergovernmental Commission on Human Rights (AICHR)	
Asia	Asian Human Rights Commission	Non-governmental
Council of Europe (Europe)	European Commission on Human Rights	1954 to 1998; defunct
Council of Europe (Europe)	International Society for Human Rights	Non-governmental

== National or subnational bodies ==
National and sub-national human rights commissions have been established in a number of countries for the promotion and protection of their citizens' human rights, and most commissions are public bodies but with some degree of independence from the state. In other countries the ombudsman performs that role. The commissions below are state-sponsored except where indicated.

=== Africa ===
Country	Commission	Note
Algeria	National Consultative Commission for the Promotion and Protection of Human Rights	
(Benin) Bénin	Benin Human Rights Commission	
Burkina Faso	National Human Rights Commission of Burkina Faso	
Cameroon	National Commission on Human Rights and Freedoms	
Chad	Chad National Human Rights Commission	
Democratic Republic of the Congo	National Human Rights Observatory	
Egypt	National Council for Human Rights	
Ethiopia	Ethiopian Human Rights Commission	
Gabon	National Human Rights Commission	
Ghana	Commission on Human Rights and Administrative Justice	
Kenya	Kenya National Commission on Human Rights	Official body
Kenya	Kenya Human Rights Commission	NGO
Madagascar	National Human Rights Commission	
Malawi	Malawi Human Rights Commission	
Mali	Commission nationale consultative des droits de l’homme	
Mauritania	Commissariat aux Droits de l’Homme, a la Lutte contre la Pauvreté et l’Insertion	
Mauritius	National Human Rights Commission	
Morocco	Human Rights Advisory Council	
Niger	Nigérien National Commission on Human Rights and Fundamental Liberties	
Nigeria	National Human Rights Commission	
Rwanda	National Commission for Human Rights	
Senegal	Senegalese Committee for Human Rights	
Sierra Leone	Human Rights Commission of Sierra Leone	
South Africa	South African Human Rights Commission	
Sudan	Southern Sudan Human Rights Commission	
Tanzania	Commission for Human Rights and Good Governance	
Togo	National Human Rights Commission	
Tunisia	Higher Committee on Human Rights and Fundamental Freedoms	
Uganda	Uganda Human Rights Commission (UHRC)	
Zambia	Permanent Human Rights Commission	
Zimbabwe	Zimbabwe Human Rights Commission (ZHRC)	

=== Asia-Pacific ===
Country	Commission	Note
Afghanistan	Afghan Independent Human Rights Commission	
Australia	Australian Human Rights Commission	
Australia	Australian Capital Territory Human Rights Commission	
Australia	Queensland Human Rights Commission	
Australia	Victorian Equal Opportunity and Human Rights Commission	
Bangladesh	Bangladesh Human Rights Commission	
Fiji	Fiji Human Rights Commission	No longer ICC-accredited
Hong Kong		Human rights complaints are referred here
India	National Human Rights Commission of India	National official statutory body
India	Kashmir Human Rights Commission	Was a state official body until replaced by NHRC.
Indonesia	National Commission on Human Rights (Komnas HAM)	
Iran	Islamic Human Rights Commission	
Jordan	National Centre for Human Rights	
(South Korea) Korea, Republic of	National Human Rights Commission of Korea	
Malaysia	Human Rights Commission of Malaysia	
Maldives	Human Rights Commission of the Maldives	
Mongolia	National Human Rights Commission (Mongolia)	
Myanmar	Myanmar National Human Rights Commission	
New Zealand	New Zealand Human Rights Commission	
Nepal	National Human Rights Commission (Nepal)	
Pakistan	Human Rights Commission of Pakistan	non-governmental organization
Pakistan	Kashmir Human Rights Commission	UK-based non-governmental organization
Palestine	Palestinian Independent Commission for Citizen's Rights	
Philippines	Commission on Human Rights (Philippines)	
Qatar	National Committee for Human Rights (Qatar)	
Saudi Arabia	Human Rights Commission (Saudi Arabia)	
Sri Lanka	National Human Rights Commission (Sri Lanka)	
Taiwan	National Human Rights Commission (Taiwan)	
Thailand	National Human Rights Commission (Thailand)	

=== Europe ===
Country	Commission	Note
France	National Consultative Commission of Human Rights (France)	
(United Kingdom) Great Britain (UK)	Equality and Human Rights Commission	See also Scotland
Greece	National Human Rights Commission (Greece)	
(Republic of Ireland) Ireland	Irish Human Rights Commission	
Italy	Commissione per i Diritti Umani	
Luxembourg	Consultative Commission of Human Rights (Luxembourg)	
Netherlands	Equal Treatment Commission (Netherlands)	
(United Kingdom) Northern Ireland (UK)	Northern Ireland Human Rights Commission	
(United Kingdom) Scotland (UK)	Scottish Human Rights Commission	See also Great Britain
Switzerland	Federal Commission against Racism (Switzerland)	
Ukraine	Ombudsman in Ukraine	
United Kingdom	Islamic Human Rights Commission	Non-governmental organization

=== Americas ===
Country	Commission	Note
Canada	Canadian Human Rights Commission	Federal
Canada	Alberta Human Rights Commission	
Canada	Manitoba Human Rights Commission	
Canada	New Brunswick Human Rights Commission	
Canada	Nova Scotia Human Rights Commission	
Canada	Northwest Territories Human Rights Commission	
Canada	Newfoundland and Labrador Human Rights Commission	
Canada	Ontario Human Rights Commission	
Canada	PEI Human Rights Commission	Prince Edward Island
Canada	Commission des droits de la personne et des droits de la jeunesse	Quebec
Canada	Saskatchewan Human Rights Commission	
Canada	Yukon Human Rights Commission	
Guatemala	Guatemala Human Rights Commission	US-based NGO
Mexico	National Human Rights Commission (Mexico)	
Peru	National Human Rights Commission (Peru)	
United States	Tom Lantos Human Rights Commission	
United States	United States Commission on Civil Rights	
United States	Idaho Human Rights Commission	
United States	Alaska State Commission for Human Rights	
United States	Illinois Human Rights Commission	
United States	Human Rights Commission of Salt Lake City	
United States	Santa Clara County Human Rights Commission	
United States	San Francisco Human Rights Commission	
United States	New York City Commission on Human Rights	
United States	Seattle Human Rights Commission	
United States	Sioux City Human Rights Commission	
United States	Salem Oregon Human Rights & Relations Advisory Commission	
United States	International Gay and Lesbian Human Rights Commission	US-based INGO

== See also ==
- Truth and reconciliation commission
- Ombudsman
