= Prince of Wales Northern Heritage Centre =

Coordinates: 62°27′22″N 114°22′48″W

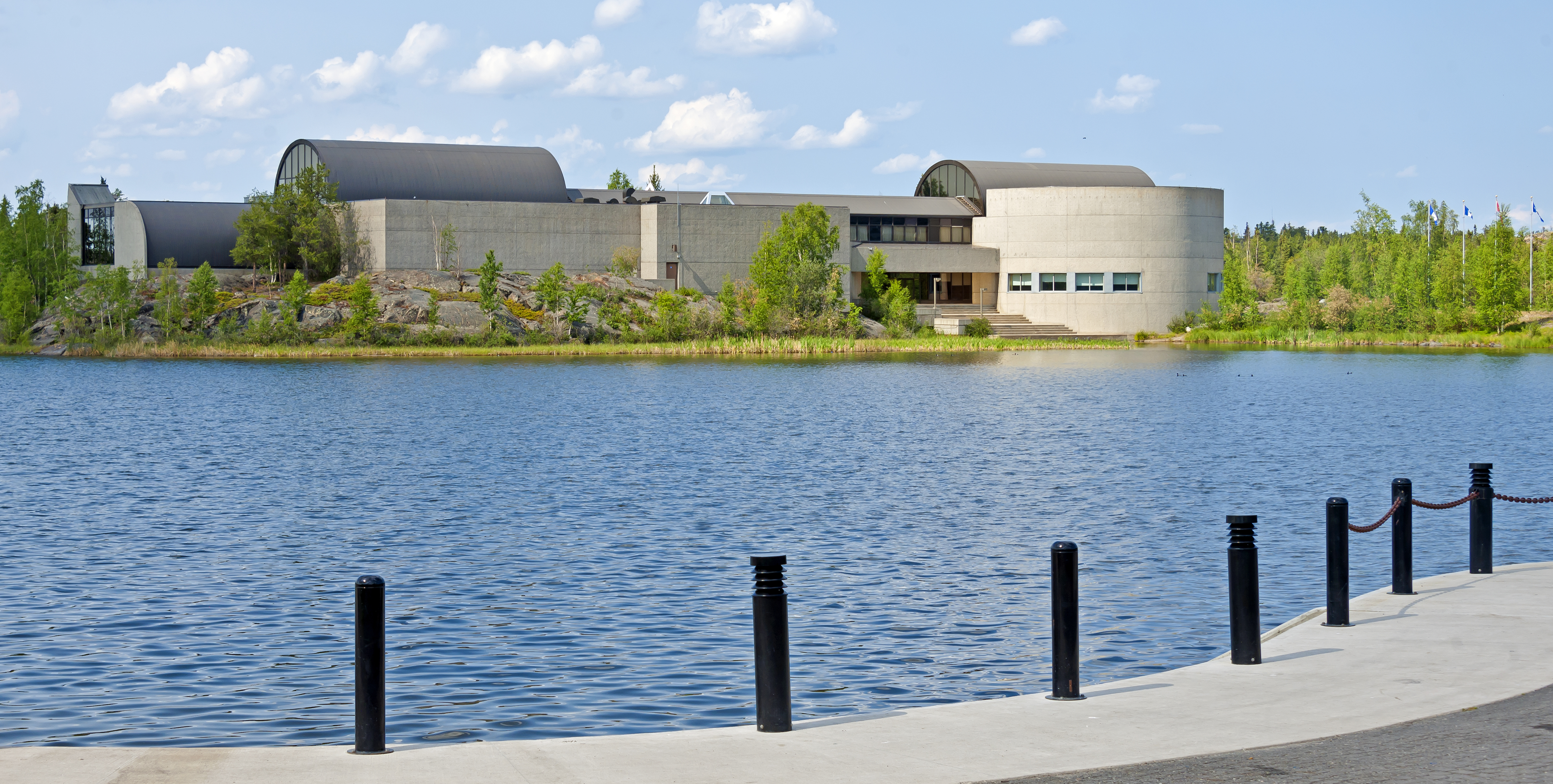
- Established: 1979
- Location: 4750 48th Street; Yellowknife, Northwest Territories; X1A 2L9
- Type: Northern Heritage Centre
- Director: Sarah Carr-Locke
- Website: http://www.pwnhc.ca/

The Prince of Wales Northern Heritage Centre (PWNHC) (Centre du patrimoine septentrional Prince-de-Galles in French) is the Government of the Northwest Territories' museum and archives. Located in Yellowknife, Northwest Territories, Canada, the PWNHC acquires and manages objects and archival materials that represent the cultures and history of the Northwest Territories (NWT), plays a primary role in documenting and providing information about the cultures and history of the NWT, and provides a professional museum, archives and cultural resource management services to partner organizations.

== History ==
A group of history-minded Yellowknifers first envisioned a museum for the Northwest Territories in the early 1950s and after several years of planning, and three years of construction, the 'Museum of the North' opened in July 1963 in downtown Yellowknife. It was operated by volunteers with the Yellowknife Museum Society until 1970 when care of its artifacts was transferred to the Government of the Northwest Territories.

Planning for a larger institution began due to concern over the loss of northern artifacts and collections, and the need to provide museum services and support throughout the Northwest Territories under a government mandate. In 1972, a program calling for the development of museum services in the NWT received official approval from the Government of the Northwest Territories. Construction started in 1975. On April 3, 1979, His Royal Highness, Prince Charles, Prince of Wales, officiated at the opening of the facility that bears his name.

The PWNHC holds in trust for the public a large collection of objects that represent the peoples and cultures of the NWT, and produces exhibitions that tell stories about the land, people and history of the NWT. However, the PWNHC is "more than a museum". In addition to its exhibits, collections and conservation programs, the PWNHC houses the NWT Archives, provides technical, logistic and financial support to individuals and organizations involved in cultural activities and the arts, and authorizes archaeological studies in the NWT.

== Images ==
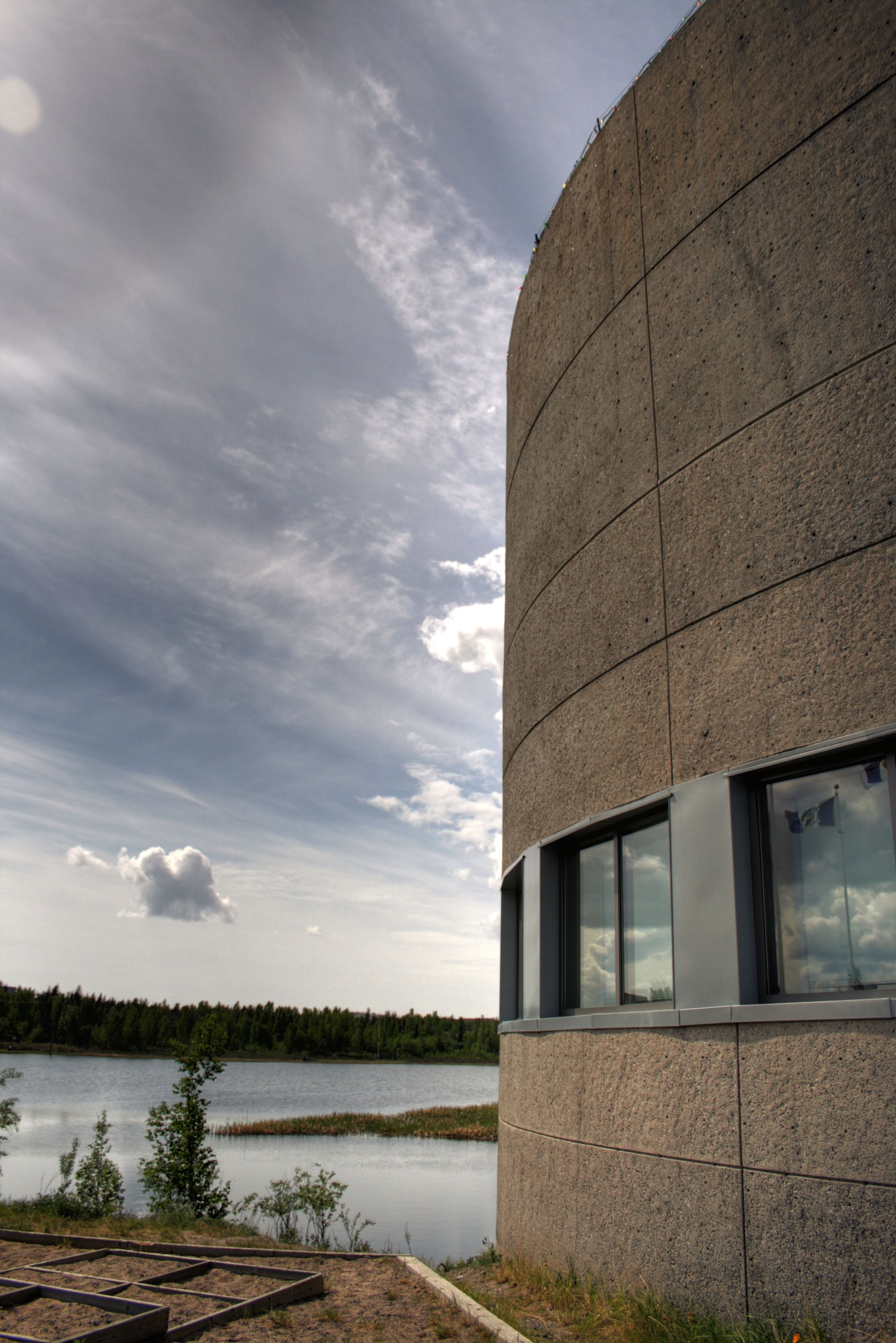
Prince of Wales Northern Heritage Centre

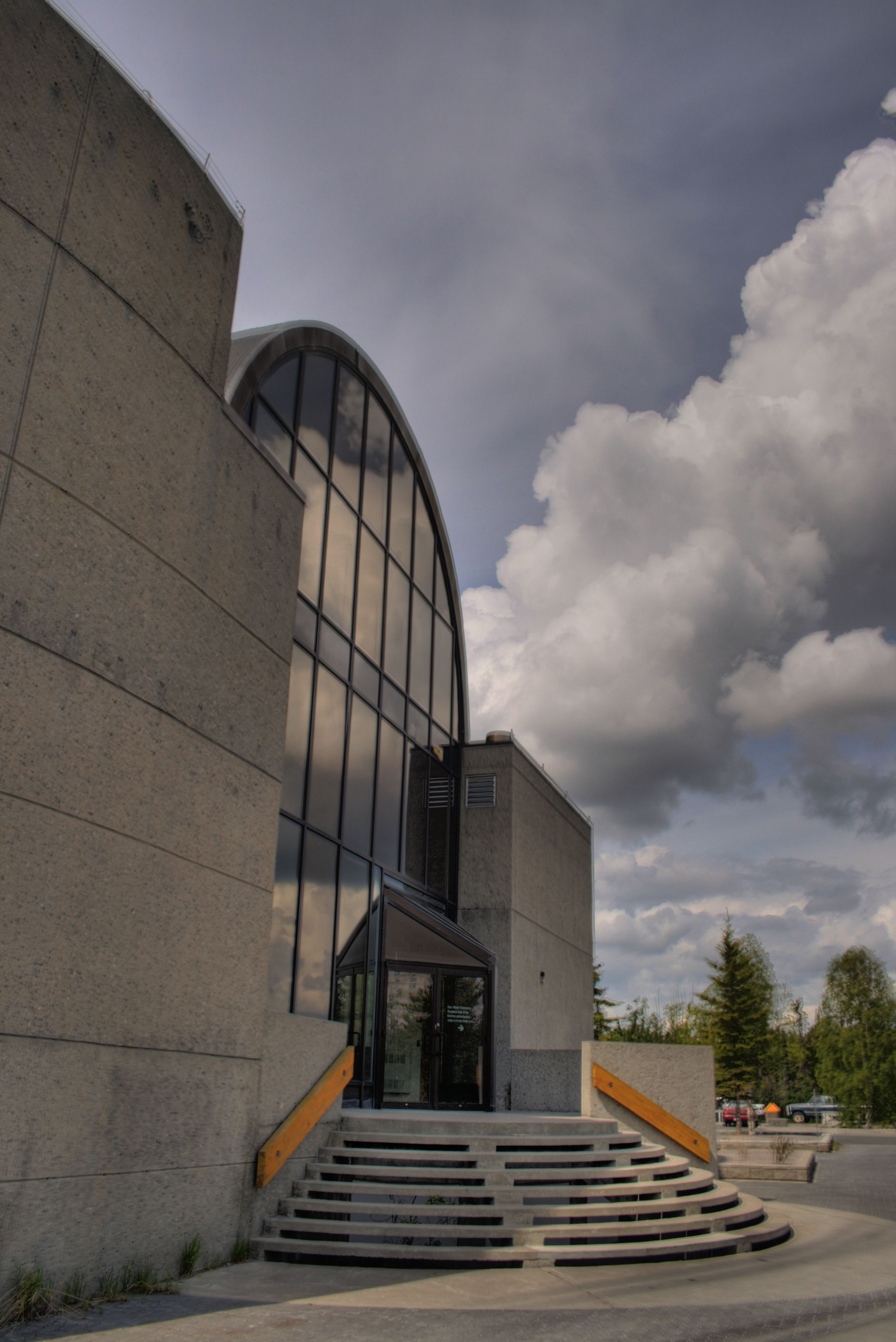
Prince of Wales Northern Heritage Centre

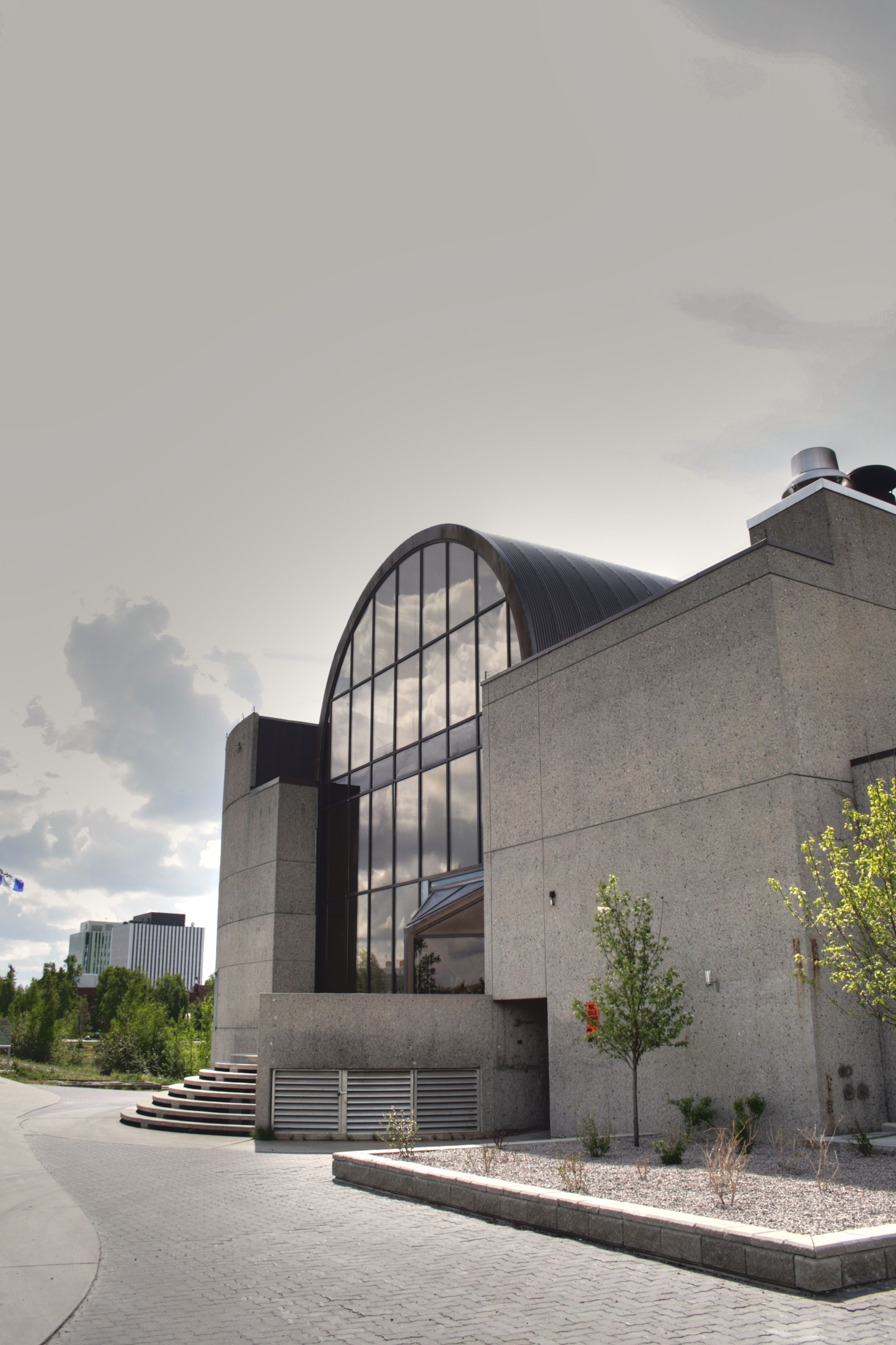
Prince of Wales Northern Heritage Centre

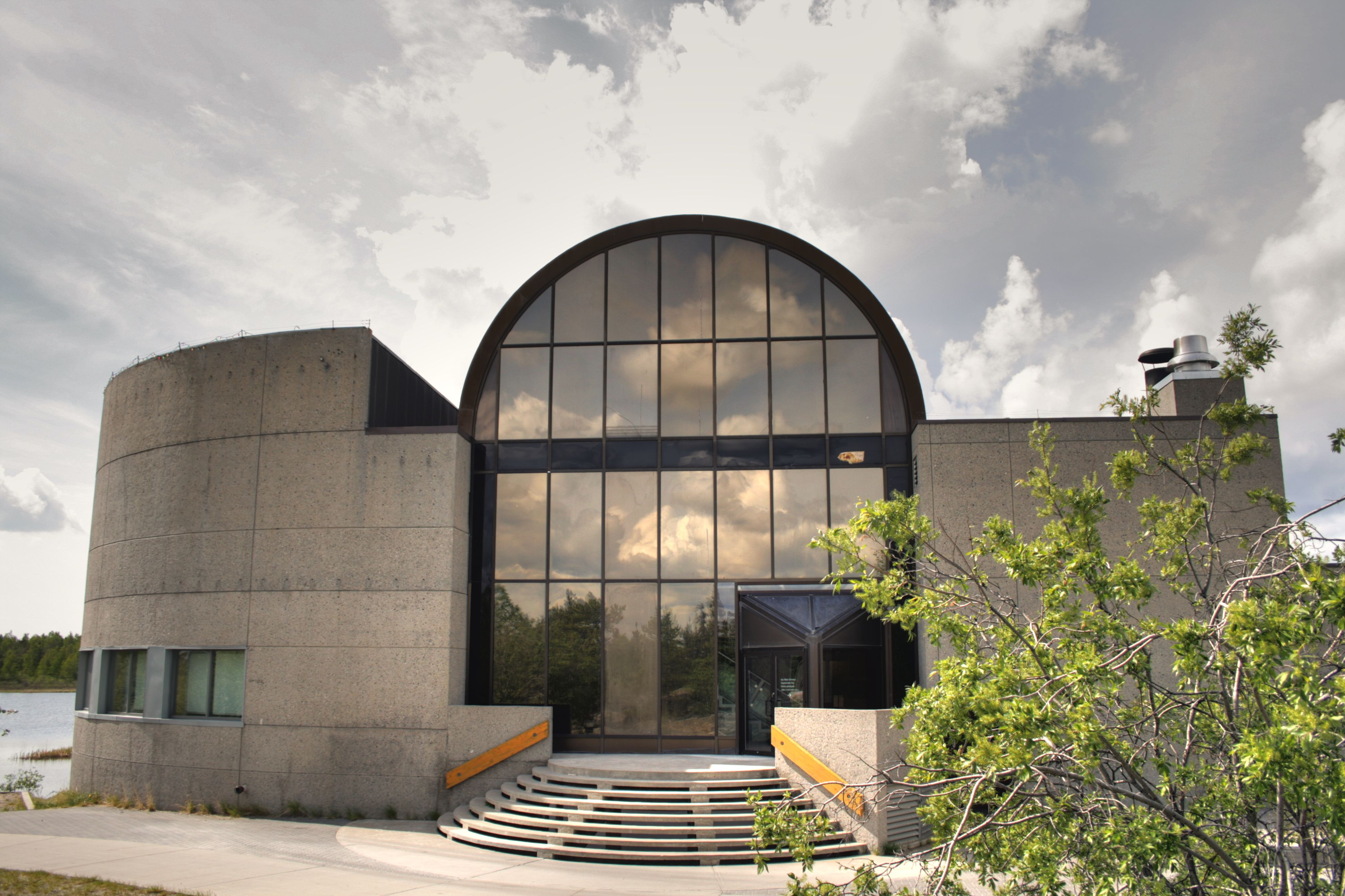
Prince of Wales Northern Heritage Centre

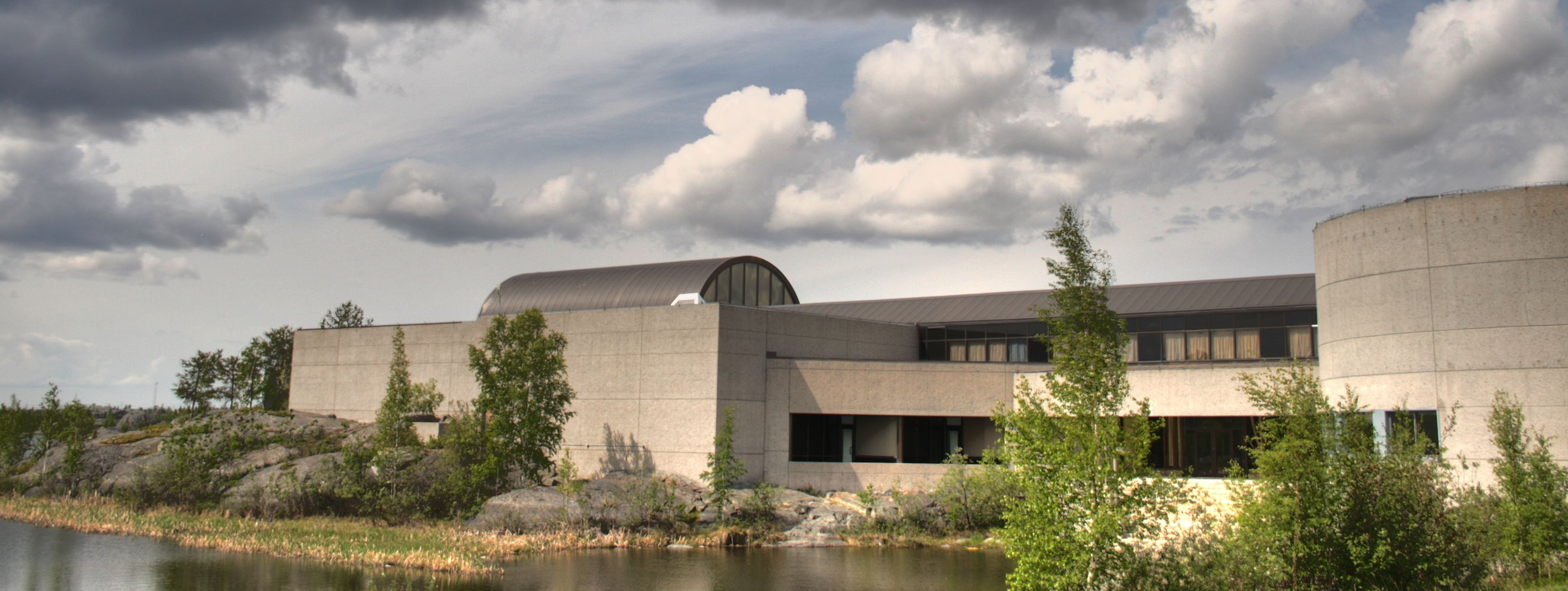
Prince of Wales Northern Heritage Centre

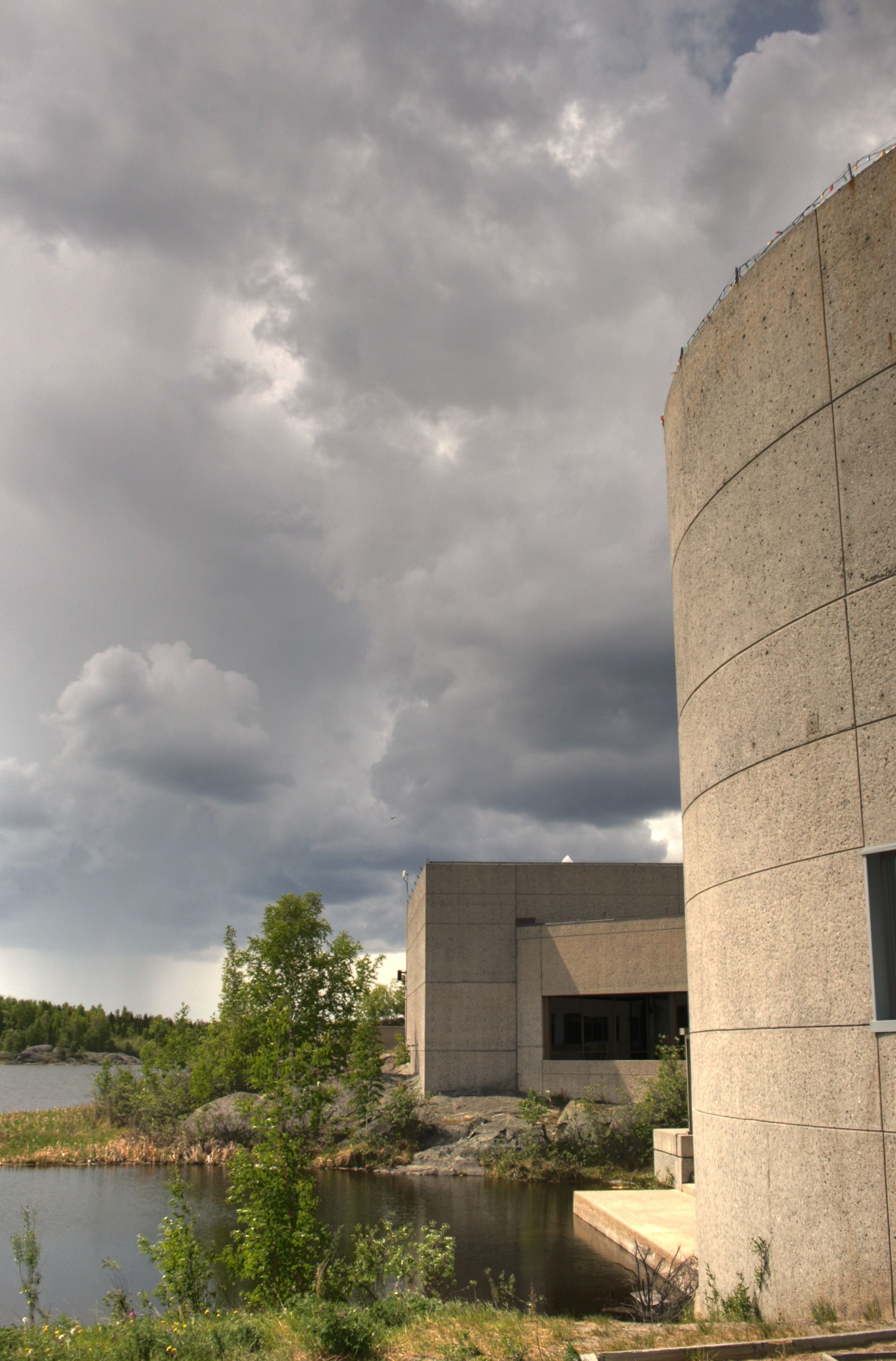
Prince of Wales Northern Heritage Centre

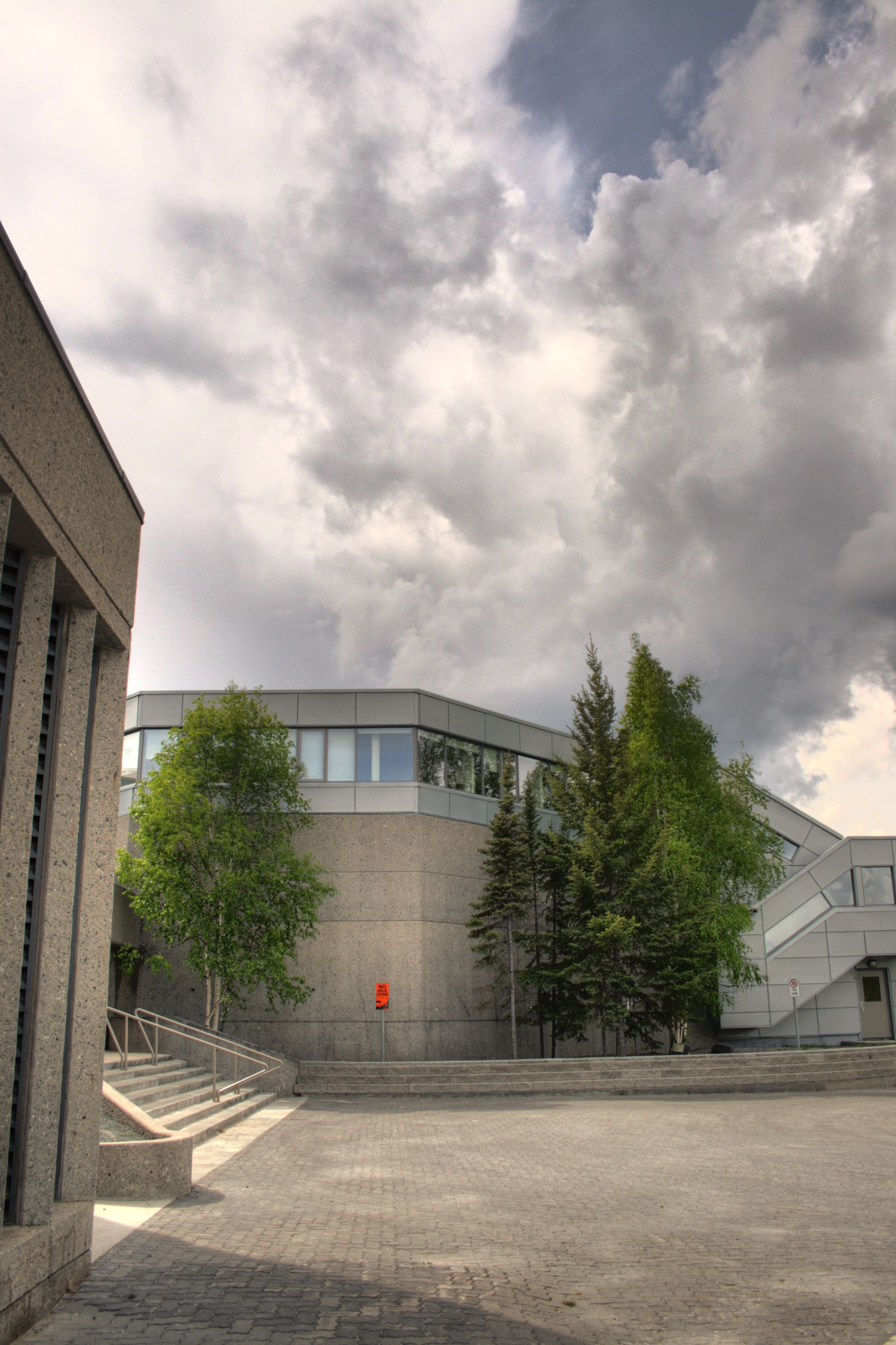
Prince of Wales Northern Heritage Centre

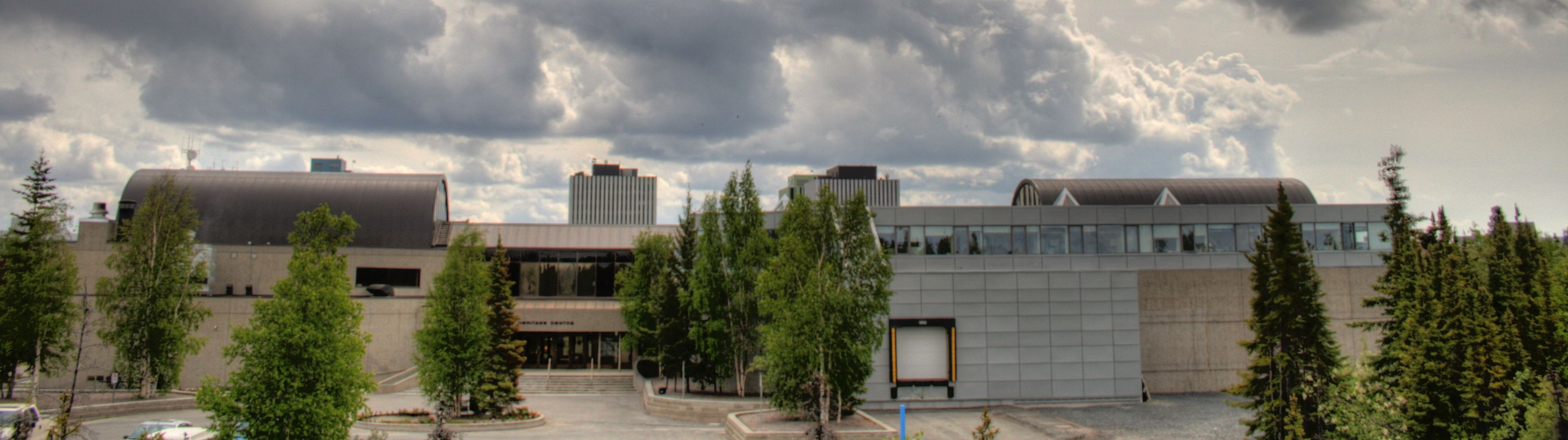
Prince of Wales Northern Heritage Centre

== Authority ==
The mandate for the PWNHC's activities derives from the Northwest Territories Archives Act, the Northwest Territories Historical Resources Act, and the Northwest Territories Archaeological Sites Regulations.

== Affiliations ==
The Museum is affiliated with: NWT Archives NWT Archives Council CMA, CHIN, and Virtual Museum of Canada.

== See also ==
- List of museums in the Northwest Territories
- Royal eponyms in Canada
