= Brian Spencer =

Canadian ice hockey player (1949–1988)

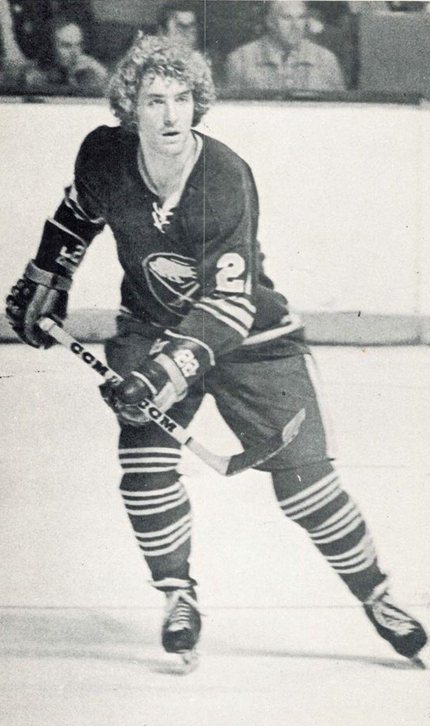
- Born: September 3, 1949 Fort St. James, British Columbia, Canada
- Died: June 3, 1988 (aged 38) Riviera Beach, Florida, U.S.
- Height: 5 ft 11 in (180 cm)
- Weight: 185 lb (84 kg; 13 st 3 lb)
- Position: Left wing
- Shot: Left
- Played for: Toronto Maple Leafs; New York Islanders; Buffalo Sabres; Pittsburgh Penguins
- NHL draft: 55th overall, 1969; Toronto Maple Leafs
- Playing career: 1969–1980

Brian Roy "Spinner" Spencer (September 3, 1949 – June 3, 1988) was a Canadian professional ice hockey player who played ten seasons in the National Hockey League for the Toronto Maple Leafs, New York Islanders, Buffalo Sabres, and Pittsburgh Penguins.

== Career ==
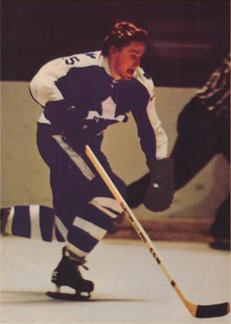
Brian Spencer in a 1971 photo for Toronto Maple Leafs

Brian Spencer was drafted in the fifth round, 55th overall by the Toronto Maple Leafs in the 1969 NHL amateur draft. On December 12, 1970, when Spencer was called up to play with the Leafs in what was his first NHL game on television, he telephoned his father Roy in British Columbia to tell him to watch the game that night on Hockey Night in Canada. Spencer was to be interviewed between periods of the game. However, a game featuring the Vancouver Canucks versus the California Golden Seals was aired instead. Infuriated, Roy Spencer drove 135 kilometres (84 mi) to Prince George, where the closest TV station, CKPG-TV (then a CBC Television affiliate), is located. When he arrived, he ordered station staff, at gunpoint, to broadcast the Maple Leafs game or, if no feed was available, to turn off the hockey entirely. The station complied, but as Roy Spencer left the station, he was confronted by the Royal Canadian Mounted Police. After a brief stand-off Roy Spencer was shot and killed.

== Death ==
After hockey, Spencer submerged himself in a life of alcohol and violence. In 1987, he was charged with kidnapping and murder in Florida and faced the death penalty. Family and friends, including ex-teammates, gathered around him and tried to help. A former teammate from the Sabres, Rick Martin, tried to help by testifying as a character witness at his trial. The jury returned a not guilty verdict in March 1988 and Spencer vowed to change his life. Despite the acquittal, Spencer's life continued to spiral out of control. Three months later, Spencer died under similar circumstances to his father; he was fatally shot in a robbery following a crack cocaine purchase in Riviera Beach, Florida.

Spencer was survived by five children from two marriages, and his twin brother, Byron.

== Gross Misconduct: The Life of Spinner Spencer ==
In 1989, Martin O'Malley authored the biography Gross Misconduct: The Life of Spinner Spencer. The book was adapted in 1993, by Paul Gross, for the Canadian TV movie Gross Misconduct (a.k.a. Gross Misconduct: The Life of Spinner Spencer). It was directed by Atom Egoyan, who later called it one of the turning points of his career.

== Career statistics ==
=== Regular season and playoffs ===
			Regular season					Playoffs
Season	Team	League	GP	G	A	Pts	PIM	GP	G	A	Pts	PIM
1967–68	Calgary Centennials	WCHL	34	13	10	23	27	—	—	—	—	—
1967–68	Regina Pats	WCHL	23	1	2	3	12	—	—	—	—	—
1968–69	Estevan Bruins	WCHL	53	19	29	48	120	4	3	1	4	14
1968–69	Swift Current Broncos	WCHL	—	—	—	—	—	—	—	—	—	—
1969–70	Toronto Maple Leafs	NHL	9	0	0	0	12	—	—	—	—	—
1969–70	Tulsa Oilers	CHL	66	13	19	32	186	—	—	—	—	—
1970–71	Toronto Maple Leafs	NHL	50	9	15	24	115	6	0	1	1	17
1970–71	Tulsa Oilers	CHL	23	6	8	14	103	—	—	—	—	—
1971–72	Toronto Maple Leafs	NHL	36	1	5	6	65	—	—	—	—	—
1971–72	Tulsa Oilers	CHL	20	7	7	14	115	—	—	—	—	—
1972–73	New York Islanders	NHL	78	14	24	38	90	—	—	—	—	—
1973–74	New York Islanders	NHL	54	5	16	21	65	—	—	—	—	—
1973–74	Buffalo Sabres	NHL	13	3	2	5	4	—	—	—	—	—
1974–75	Buffalo Sabres	NHL	73	12	29	41	77	16	0	4	4	8
1975–76	Buffalo Sabres	NHL	77	13	26	39	70	9	1	0	1	4
1976–77	Buffalo Sabres	NHL	77	14	15	29	55	6	0	0	0	0
1977–78	Pittsburgh Penguins	NHL	79	9	11	20	81	—	—	—	—	—
1978–79	Pittsburgh Penguins	NHL	7	0	0	0	0	—	—	—	—	—
1978–79	Binghamton Dusters	AHL	39	5	9	14	58	—	—	—	—	—
1979–80	Springfield Indians	AHL	9	1	1	2	0	—	—	—	—	—
1979–80	Hershey Bears	AHL	30	0	4	4	23	—	—	—	—	—
NHL totals			553	80	143	223	634	37	1	5	6	29

== See also ==
- List of unsolved murders (1980–1999)
