= List of museums in the Northwest Territories =

This list of museums in the Northwest Territories, Canada contains museums which are defined for this context as institutions (including nonprofit organizations, government entities, and private businesses) that collect and care for objects of cultural, artistic, scientific, or historical interest and make their collections or related exhibits available for public viewing. Also included are non-profit art galleries and university art galleries. Museums that exist only in cyberspace (i.e., virtual museums) are not included.

Name	Town/City	Type	Summary
N.W.T. Mining Heritage Society	Yellowknife	Mining	Planned museum
Norman Wells Historical Centre	Norman Wells	Multiple	website, includes history of the Canol Trail, oil industry, aviation, mining, hunting, fossils, geology, native crafts and artifacts
Northern Life Museum	Fort Smith	History	
Prince of Wales Northern Heritage Centre	Yellowknife	Multiple	Human and natural history of the Northwest Territories

== See also ==
- List of museums in Canada
