= Royal Oak Mines =

Gold mining company

Royal Oak Mines Incorporated
- Industry: Mining
- Founded: 1990; 36 years ago in Kirkland, Washington
- Founder: Margaret "Peggy" Witte
- Defunct: April 1999
- Fate: Bankruptcy liquidation

Royal Oak Mines Incorporated was a gold mining company, founded in 1990 by Margaret "Peggy" Witte (now known as Margaret Kent) in Kirkland, Washington.

The company held numerous gold and base metal properties in Canada, including the Giant Mine in the Northwest Territories, the Pamour Mine in Ontario, the Hope Brook Mine in Newfoundland, the Colomac Mine in the Northwest Territories, and the Kemess Mine in British Columbia. The company also had significant interests in minerals in China through Asia Materials (44% share) and Highwood Resources (39% share). The company reported nearly US$600 million in assets, and a loss of $4.4 million on revenues of US$187 million for fiscal 1996. Its Hopebrook and Colomac mines were closed in 1997. Low gold prices of 1997-1998 caused Royal Oak to go bankrupt in April 1999, and its mining assets were liquidated.

== Labour dispute ==
Royal Oak Mines' operations at the Giant Mine in Yellowknife became infamous in Canada during the 1990s as the site of a protracted and violent industrial relations dispute that lasted eighteen months. The declining price of gold led to Witte demanding pay cuts, which the Canadian Association of Smelter and Allied Workers union (CASAW) Local 4 refused, arguing that the company was also lax on safety.

The company locked out the union and flew in strikebreakers.

On September 18, 1992, at the height of the labour dispute, an explosion in a drift of the mine, 750 ft (230 m) underground, killed nine strikebreakers/replacement workers riding in a man-car.

For 13 months after the blast, the RCMP interrogated hundreds of strikers, their families, and supporters, wiretapped their telephones, and searched their homes. Owner Margaret Witte said that there would be no negotiations with the union unless an arrest was made.

=== Criminal charges ===
Union member and dismissed miner Roger Warren later confessed to and was convicted by a jury of nine counts of second degree murder, being sentenced to life imprisonment. In 2004, he blamed Royal Oak Mines, the security company, and his union. He argued that a simple screen and padlock over a broken window would have dissuaded him, and that he was only capable of the bombing because replacement workers had been "dehumanized" by his union.

CAW members Al Shearing and Tim Bettger were sentenced to two and a half and three years in prison, respectively. Both were convicted of painting anti-strikebreaker graffiti and setting an explosion in a ventilation shaft on June 29, 1992. Bettger was sentenced to six more months in prison for blowing a hole in a television satellite dish Sept. 1 of that year.

=== Civil suit (Fullowka v. Royal Oak Ventures Inc.) ===
The workers' compensation board, on behalf of the surviving family members of the killed replacement workers, launched a $10 million lawsuit against several parties involved in the strike, including Royal Oak Ventures, Pinkerton's of Canada (the security firm hired by Royal Oak), the union (Canadian Association of Smelter and Allied Workers union (CASAW) Local 4), and the Government of the Northwest Territories. The compensation board had already paid out a similar amount of funds to the deceased miners' families.

At trial, the Supreme Court of the Northwest Territories found the defendants liable. Pinkerton security was held responsible for 15% of damages, for failing to adequately secure the mine. The Canadian Auto Workers (CAW) was found to have breached its duty of care by doing nothing to stop illegal acts during the strike, paying fines and legal fees for striking miners, providing a person to assist the striking union who prolonged the strike, and failing to bargain in good faith. The court ruled that the cumulative effect of these breaches of the duty of care were found to have materially contributed to Roger Warren's bombing of the mine. (The unionized miners were part of Local 4 at the time of the strike, and merged into the CAW in May 1994.) The company was found to be 23% responsible for the damages assessed, as they maintained mine operations during the strike, refused to bargain in good faith, and for failing to ensure the safety of the replacement workers.

On appeal to the Court of Appeal for the Northwest Territories, the trial decision was overturned and the defendants were found to not owe the plaintiffs a duty of care.

A further appeal to the Supreme Court of Canada was heard in May 2009. In February 2010 the appeal was dismissed. The Court found that although the security firm and the government owed a duty of care to the replacement workers, that duty was not breached.

=== Royal Oak Mines v. Canada (Labour Relations Board) ===
The employer's steadfast refusal to discuss grievance arbitration for these and other dismissed employees constituted the single largest sticking-point in the negotiations. The Canada Labour Relations Board intervened several times during the bargaining process and eventually forced Royal Oak Mines to return to the negotiation table with a previously withdrawn proposal. Royal Oak Mines sought judicial review of this order, with the dispute winding its way through the court system during the first half of the 1990s. This set the stage for significant changes in Canadian labour law as evident in the Supreme Court's 1996 decision in Royal Oak Mines v. Canada (Labour Relations Board), [1996] 1 S.C.R. 369. In his majority decision Mister Justice Peter Cory formulated a distinction between the subjective and objective aspects of the duty to bargain. A 'good faith' requirement forms the subjective aspect of this duty. In contrast, a requirement to 'make every reasonable effort' to conclude a collective agreement injects an objective standard into the analysis. In this decision Royal Oak Mines was compelled to return to the bargaining table on the basis that its refusal to discuss grievance arbitration with the Canadian Association of Smelter and Allied Workers, Local No. 4, constituted an unreasonable limitation on the bargaining process and thereby represented a lack of good faith. In coming to this conclusion the Court observed that grievance arbitration for dismissed employees was a nearly universal characteristic of collective agreements in Canada.
