= Giant Mine =

Defunct gold mine in Northwest Territories, Canada (1948–2004)

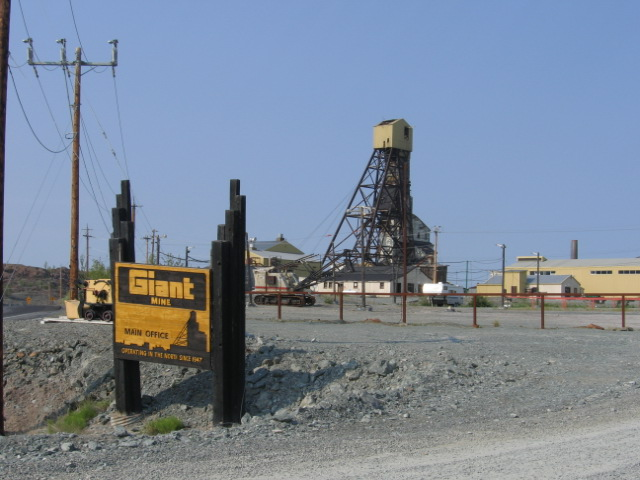
- Giant Mine

- Location in Canada
- Location: Northwest Territories, Canada; 62°29′59″N 114°21′31″W
- Discovered: 1935
- Opened: 1948
- Closed: 2004
- Company: Miramar Mining Corporation
- Acquired: 1999

The Giant Mine was a gold mine located on the Ingraham Trail, 5 km (3.1 mi) north of Yellowknife, Northwest Territories. Giant Mine was within the Kam Group, a part of the Yellowknife greenstone belt. Gold was discovered on the property and mineral claims staked in 1935 by Johnny Baker, but the true extent of the gold deposits was not known until 1944, when a massive gold-bearing shear zone was uncovered beneath the drift-filled Baker Creek Valley.

== History ==
The discovery led to a massive post-war staking boom in Yellowknife. Giant Mine entered production in 1948 and ceased operations in 2004. It produced over 7,000,000 ozt (220,000 kg) of gold. Owners of the mine have included Falconbridge (1948–1986 through subsidiary Giant Yellowknife Mines Limited), Pamour of Australia (1986–1990 through subsidiary Giant Yellowknife Mines Limited), and Royal Oak Mines (1990–1999). When Royal Oak went bankrupt in 1999 the Department of Indian Affairs and Northern Development (DIAND) took over responsibility for cleaning up the Giant mine site. Miramar Mining Corporation subsequently entered into an arrangement with the government whereby Miramar held the mine operation in care and maintenance, continued underground dewatering operations, and removed the remaining ore from underground for treatment at the nearby Con Mine process facility (1999–2004).

According to an article published in The Star in 2006, there were 15 sealed underground storage chambers 250 feet below ground containing a total of 237,000 tonnes (233,000 long tons; 261,000 short tons) of deadly arsenic trioxide dust, containing up to 60% organic and inorganic arsenic. The dust was a byproduct of extracting gold from the mineral and was collected and stored in sealed underground chambers from 1951 to 1999. Prior to legislated collection and underground storage in 1951 arsenic was released directly into the atmosphere during the roasting process. Arsenic trioxide readily dissolves in water; in 2006 underground flooding around Giant Mine's Mill Pond's underground chamber which contained 16,946 tonnes (16,678 long tons; 18,680 short tons) of arsenic trioxide dust threatened to migrate out of the chamber if it was flooded and dump large amounts of arsenic into Yellowknife Bay.

=== Bombing ===
On September 18, 1992, at the height of a labour dispute during the tenure of Royal Oak Mines ownership, an explosion in a drift of the mine, 750 ft (230 m) underground, killed nine strikebreakers. Mine employee Roger Warren was later convicted of placing the bomb. The strike/lockout ended in 1993, pursuant to an order by the (then) Canada Labour Relations Board. A civil suit also resulted on behalf of the families of the replacement workers killed in the explosion (Fullowka v. Royal Oak Ventures Inc.). In 2008, the nine Giant Mine widows lost their $10-million civil judgment when the Northwest Territories Supreme Court overturned an earlier ruling. Roger Warren died in 2019.

== Contamination ==
Mining operations over five decades have created a massive environmental liability, a problem which the mine's previous owners left to the Government of Canada and Government of the Northwest Territories to sort out. The site's 950 ha (2,300 acres) footprint includes 8 open pits, 4 tailing ponds, 325,000 m^{3} (11,500,000 cu ft) of contaminated soils, and approximately 100 buildings including a roaster/bag house complex that is highly contaminated with arsenic trioxide dust and fibrous asbestos. The remediation plan proposed by the SRK Consulting Inc. and SENES Consultants Limited, the leading technical advisors since 2000 to Aboriginal Affairs and Northern Development Canada on the Giant Mine Remediation Project, includes underground issues such as dust that contains arsenic trioxide, and remediation of the surface, water and Baker Creek.

=== Remediation ===
Aboriginal Affairs and Northern Development Canada reported that the "greatest challenge associated with the remediation of Giant Mine" is the safe long-term storage 237,000 t (233,000 long tons; 261,000 short tons) of the arsenic trioxide dust, the lethal byproduct of extracting gold from the mineral arsenopyrite ore stored underground. Their top priority for the Giant Mine site remediation is an "effective, long-term management" of arsenic trioxide. Arsenic trioxide dust, which contains approximately 60% arsenic, is highly lethal even in small doses. It is odourless, tasteless and semi water-soluble. The arsenic trioxide dust is stored in 15 stope or rock chambers that have been sealed with concrete approximately 250 feet (76 meters) below the surface.

The taxpayer-funded (c. $900m to approximately one billion dollars) remediation plan to permanently freeze the underground arsenic trioxide dust chambers was approved by the Canadian federal government in August 2014. According to the federal civil servant in charge of the clean-up, Jane Amphlett, using technology like that used in ice-hockey rinks, coolants will permanently freeze the storage chambers containing the arsenic trioxide dust to keep groundwater seepage out in what is called the "Frozen Block Method." In 2022, the cost was revised upwards to $4.38 billion due to more stringent requirements and more comprehensive remediation of the site.

A Yellowknife community museum is envisioned for part of the former Giant Mine townsite.

In winter 2020 the Yellowknives Dene First Nation (YKDFN) demonstrated outside the site demanding a federal apology, compensation, and a role in the contracts for remediation. They launched their own website which details the story from their point of view.

== Film ==
The events and aftermath of the Giant Mine labour dispute and explosion were dramatized in the 1996 CBC television movie Giant Mine. Additionally, the contamination is the topic of the interactive documentary "Shadow of a Giant" by Saskatchewan filmmaker Clark Ferguson who was artist in residence with Western Arctic Moving Pictures (WAMP) in 2013.

== See also ==
- List of mines in the Northwest Territories
