= Giant Mine (film) =

2008 TV movie

- Genre: Drama
- Written by: John Hunter; Martin O'Malley
- Directed by: Penelope Buitenhuis
- Starring: Frank Moore; Peter Outerbridge; Thomas Mitchell; Alberta Watson; Peter MacNeill
- Theme music composer: Mark Korven
- Country of origin: Canada
- Original language: English

Production
- Producer: Alan Burke
- Cinematography: David Frazee
- Editor: Gordon McClellan
- Running time: 96 minutes
- Production company: Canadian Broadcasting Corporation

Original release
- Network: CBC Television
- Release: December 8, 1996

Giant Mine is a Canadian television film, which dramatizes the events of the 1992 Giant Mine labour dispute and the subsequent bomb explosion which killed nine replacement workers. The film, written by John Hunter and Martin O'Malley and directed by Penelope Buitenhuis, aired on CBC Television in 1996.

The film received three Gemini Award nominations at the 12th Gemini Awards in 1998, for Best Dramatic TV Movie or Mini-Series (Alan Burke), Best Supporting Actor in a Dramatic Program or Mini-Series (Peter MacNeill) and Best Picture Editing in a Dramatic Program or Series (Gordon McClellan).

== Cast ==
- Frank Moore as Roger Warren
- Peter Outerbridge as Jim O'Neil
- Thomas Mitchell as Chris Neill
- Alberta Watson as Peggy Witte
- Peter MacNeill as Harry Seaton
- Wayne Robson as Bill Schram
- Shawn Doyle as Al Shearing
- Scott Speedman as "Spanky" Riggs
- Caroly Larson as Carol Aitken
- Chris Benson as Arnold Russell
- Layne Coleman as Dale Hounson
