= List of museums in Canada =

== By province and territory ==
- List of museums in Alberta
- List of museums in British Columbia
- List of museums in Manitoba
- List of museums in New Brunswick
- List of museums in Newfoundland and Labrador
- List of museums in the Northwest Territories
- List of museums in Nova Scotia
- List of museums in Ontario
- List of museums in Prince Edward Island
- List of museums in Quebec
- List of museums in Saskatchewan
- List of museums in Yukon

== See also ==
- Military and war museums in Canada
- National museums of Canada
- Canadian Museums Association
- Historiography of Canada
- Organization of Military Museums of Canada Inc.
