= Martin O'Malley (journalist) =

Canadian journalist and writer (1939–2025)

- Born: 22 February 1939; Winnipeg, Manitoba, Canada
- Died: 22 February 2025 (aged 86); Whitby, Ontario, Canada
- Occupations: Journalist, writer

Martin Joseph O'Malley (22 February 1939 – 22 February 2025) was a Canadian journalist and writer. He wrote for CBC News and The Globe and Mail. O'Malley was perhaps best known for a Globe and Mail editorial in which he coined the line about laws that criminalized homosexual behavior which Canadian Prime Minister Pierre Trudeau later made famous: "There's no place for the state in the bedrooms of the nation."

== Biography ==
O'Malley was born and raised in Winnipeg, Manitoba, moving to Toronto to pursue his career as a newspaper reporter and columnist. He died in Whitby, Ontario on his 86th birthday, 22 February 2025.

He has written the following books:

- The Past and Future Land: an account of the Mackenzie Valley Pipeline Inquiry
- Doctors
- Hospital
- Gross Misconduct: The Life of Spinner Spencer
- Running Risks
- Game Day: the Blue Jays at SkyDome
- More than Meets the Eye: Watching television watching us

Gross Misconduct earned O'Malley the Author of the Year award in 1989 from the Foundation for the Advancement of Canadian Letters. The book was made into a TV film, directed by Atom Egoyan. O'Malley also wrote the CBC docudrama Giant Mine.
