= Human Rights Commission of Salt Lake City =

The Human Rights Commission of Salt Lake City, Utah, is a commission that works with the city government on issues related to the human rights of its citizens.

== Establishment ==
A city ordinance of October 2005 has established the Salt Lake City Human Rights Commission, on the model of similar organizations throughout the country. The new mayor Ralph Becker has renamed the old Office of Ethnic Minorities, established by mayor Rocky Anderson, the Office of Diversity and Human Rights. The present director is Yolanda Francisco-Nez. The Human Rights Commission will serve as an advisory board to this Office. Members of the Commission must receive the approval of the City Council. They serve for two or four years.

== Purpose ==
The major purpose of the Human Rights Commission is to advise and help the city government to check and eliminate "all discriminatory practices on the grounds of age, ancestry, color, disability, gender, national origin, marital status, medical condition, physical limitation, race, religion, or sexual orientation, because they adversely affect the general welfare of the city and the vitality of its neighborhoods."

== Activity ==
Since January 2006, the HR Commission has met regularly every month. Subcommittees have been organized to deal with various issues.

== Current members ==
Christopher Wharton, Chair
Curtis Haring, Vice Chair
Jennifer Mayer-Glenn, Secretary
Esperanza Granados
Walter Jones
Jon Jepsen
Keri Jones

== See also ==
- Human Rights Commission
- Human rights in the United States
- National and Ethnic Cultures of Utah
- Salt Lake City Law and Government Salt Lake City#Law and government
