= List of landforms of Canada =

- Canadian Arctic
- Fjords of Canada
- Glaciers of Canada
  - Great Lakes
- Mountain peaks of Canada
  - Appalachian Mountains
  - Pacific Cordillera
  - List of mountains in Canada
- List of volcanoes in Canada
- Prairies of Canada
- Rivers of Canada
- List of islands of Canada
- List of lakes in Canada
- Extreme points of Canada
- List of waterfalls in Canada
- Valleys of Canada
- World Heritage Sites in Canada
- Other
  - Canadian Shield
  - St. Lawrence Lowlands
