= PEI Human Rights Commission =

PEI Human Rights Commission is an independent government agency in Prince Edward Island. The commission reports to Legislative Assembly of Prince Edward Island through the Minister of Justice and Public Safety. Joanne Ings is the chair of the commission.

== History ==
PEI Human Rights Commission was established following the passage of the Prince Edward Island Human Rights Act in September 1976.

The commission has the authority to hold hearings following complaints of discrimination on Prince Edward Island. Decisions of the commission can be appealed in court.

In December 2020, Danté Bazard was appointed commissioner of PEI Human Rights Commission, the first black person to be commissioner.

In January 2022, the commission announced it has a backlog of over 128 cases that would take four year to clear. Kathleen Casey, Liberal member of the Legislative Assembly, has said recent immigrants to the island are not reaching out to the commission despite facing discrimination.
