= Northwest Territories Human Rights Commission =

- Established: 2004
- Type: Human rights commission, Quasi-judicial
- Purpose: Human rights commission, Quasi-judicial, Investigative
- Headquarters: Yellowknife, Northwest Territories, Canada
- Key people: Charles Dent (Chairman), Deborah Mcleod (Director)
- Employees: 5 (F2012)

The NWT Human Rights Commission is an independent body which is responsible for a number of duties under the NWT Human Rights Act (HRA).

== History ==
In 2004, the Commission was established by the enactment of the NWT Human Rights Act. The Human Rights Act is the successor legislation to the Fair Practices Act. The enactment of the Act brought NWT in line with other jurisdictions which have comprehensive human rights legislative regimes.

== Structure and Function of the Commission ==
The Commission itself is composed of two distinct yet overlapping entities which are collectively known as the Commission.

Members of the Commission are appointed by the Northwest Territories Legislative Assembly for a term of four years. These members collectively have a set of roles and responsibilities.

The Director is an officer of the Commission and is also appointed by the legislature for a four-year term. The Director is responsible for carrying out instructions given by the Commission, but also has a completely separate and independent mandate which is outside the role of the members of the Commission.

=== The Commission ===
The Commission is responsible for the following:

- Promoting awareness and understanding of the HRA
- Educating key stakeholders of relevant human rights issues
- Approving the annual budget
- Determining when the Commission should be directly involved in an adjudication of great public significance

=== The Director ===
The Director is responsible for the following:

- Carrying out instructions from the Commission which fall under their mandate
- Hiring and managing staff of the Commission
- Investigating individual complaints
- Referring individual complaints to adjudication

=== Adjudication ===
The Commission does not render decisions on the merits of individual complaints. The responsibility of adjudicating disputes rests with the Northwest Territories Human Rights Adjudication Panel, a totally separate entity.

=== Key Publications ===
The Commission provides a variety of publication in many different languages and alternative formats.

- Know Your Rights

- This is a comprehensive, plain language guide providing a complete overview of the HRA
