= Language Bureau of the Northwest Territories =

The Language Bureau
- Type: Government agency based in the Northwest Territories
- Legal status: Defunct
- Purpose: Provided translation and interpretation services, language literacy programs, training and certification of translators and interpreters, research in terminology and language development.
- Location: Yellowknife, Northwest Territories
- Region served: Northwest Territories
- Official language: Chipewyan, Cree, English, French, Gwich'in, Inuinnaqtun, Inuktitut, Inuvialuktun, North Slavey, South Slavey, Tłı̨chǫ
- Parent organization: Legislative Assembly of the Northwest Territories
- Affiliations: Interpreters/Translators Society of the Northwest Territories, Arctic College

The Language Bureau was a government agency that provided language services in the 11 official languages of the Northwest Territories for nearly 25 years.

== History ==
The Language Bureau was established in the early 1970s by the Government of the Northwest Territories. At its inception, the Language Bureau employed three permanent Inuit translator/interpreters and four temporary Dene translator/interpreters for nine elected members of Parliament.

Along with providing translation and interpretation services, the bureau was responsible for language literacy programs, training and certification of translators and interpreters, terminology research, and language development. The election of unilingual Aboriginal MLAs and changes to legislation and language policy, requiring services to be available in Aboriginal languages and extending the right to sit on a jury to unilingual Aboriginal people, increased demand for the bureau’s services. In 1993, their staff had grown to 21, including 13 Inuit translator/interpreters and 8 Dene translator/interpreters.

The Language Bureau was active for nearly 25 years. It was closed in the late 1990s.

== Responsibilities ==
=== Language Services ===
The bureau offered translation of government documents into Aboriginal languages, simultaneous interpreting in Parliament, and interpreting at community meetings, in a number of ministries and in courts. In 1993, services were being provided in 5 Dene languages (Chipewyan, Tłįchǫ, Gwich’in, North and South Slavey and Cree), 2 Inuit languages (Inuktitut, Inuvialuktun) and French.

=== Terminology and Language Development ===
The bureau developed terminology in specialized fields like medicine and law, compiled lexicons and worked with linguists to translate "bureaucratic buzzwords". It contributed to the preservation of oral Aboriginal languages, for example, continuing the development of a Dene writing system in Romanized orthography. It also offered Dene language literacy courses jointly with the Department of Education, targeted to people becoming teachers or interpreters.

=== Training ===
Before any translation and interpretation programs were available elsewhere in the Northwest Territories, training was provided by the Language Bureau. In 1987 and with government funding, Arctic College began offering year-long certificates in translating/interpreting at two of its campuses. The bureau and the college both offered certificates until the program was cut in 1996, and until the Language Bureau was closed in the late 1990s.

== See also ==
- Arctic College
- Dene languages
- Inuit languages
- Legislative Assembly of the Northwest Territories
- Northwest Territories
