= Symbols of the Northwest Territories =

The Northwest Territories, one of Canada's territories, has established several territorial symbols.

== Symbols ==
	Symbol	Image	Adopted	Remarks
Coat of arms	Coat of arms of Northwest Territories	Coat of arms of Northwest Territories	February 24, 1956	Granted by royal warrant of Queen Elizabeth II.
Flag	Flag of Northwest Territories	Flag of the Northwest Territories	January 1969	Adopted by the Council of the Northwest Territories, designed by Robert Bessant.
Shield of arms	Shield of arms of Northwest Territories		February 24, 1956	Granted with other elements of the coat of arms
Seal	The Seal of the Northwest Territories		November 29, 1956	The Seal of the Northwest Territories consists of the coat of arms of the NWT encircled by the words, "The Seal of the Northwest Territories."
Mace	The Mace of Northwest Territories	NWT mace	January 2000	It is the symbol of the Authority of the Legislative Assembly. It is a ceremonial staff carried by the Sergeant-at-Arms into the Chamber.
Flower	Mountain avens Dryas octopetala	Mountain avens	June 1957	It grows abundantly in the eastern and central Arctic, as well as in parts of the Mackenzie River
Bird	Gyrfalcon; Falco rusticolus	Gyrfalcon	1990	They are found throughout the tundra, including all the Canadian Arctic Archipelago.
Tree	Tamarack larch Larix laricina	Tamarack larch	September 9, 1999	Replaced the jack pine as territorial tree in 1999.
Fish	Arctic grayling Thymallus arcticus	Arctic grayling	September 9, 1999	Found in various habitats in the Northwest Territories.
Mineral	Gold	Gold nugget	May 1981	Gold has played a major role in the development the Northwest Territories.
Gemstone	Diamond	Rough diamond	September 9, 1999	The first Canadian diamond mine was opened in the Northwest Territories.
Tartan	White, green, yellow, red and blues		1961 due to the efforts of the Edmonton Rehabilitation Society for the Handicapped.	The tartan is registered at the Court of the Lord Lyon, King of Arms of Scotland
Territorial Symbol	Polar bear	Polar bear		
