= Coat of arms of the Northwest Territories =

Canadian territorial heraldic symbol

Arms of the Northwest Territories

Versions
- Escutcheon

- Badge of the Commissioner
- Adopted: 1956
- Crest: A compass rose proper between two narwhals haurient and addorsed Or
- Shield: Per bend wavy Gules and Vert billetty Or in sinister chief the mask of an Arctic fox Argent on a chief indented of the last a barrulet wavy Azure

The coat of arms of the Northwest Territories was granted by a Royal Warrant of Queen Elizabeth II on 24 February 1956. The shield is featured on the territorial flag. The coat of arms was designed by Canadian heraldry expert Alan Beddoe in the early 1950s.

== Symbolism ==
The crest consists of two gold narwhals guarding a compass rose, symbolic of the magnetic North Pole. The white upper third of the shield represents the polar ice pack and is crossed by a wavy blue line symbolizing the Northwest Passage. The diagonal line separating the red and green segments of the lower portion of the shield reflects the tree line. The green symbolizes the forested areas south of the tree line, while the red represents the tundra to the north. Minerals and fur, the important bases of the northern wealth, are represented by gold billets in the green portion and the mask of the white fox in the red.

== See also ==
- Symbols of the Northwest Territories
- National symbols of Canada
- List of Canadian provincial and territorial symbols
- Heraldry
