= Geology of the Northwest Territories =

The geology of the Northwest Territories has been mapped in different quadrangles by the Canadian government. The region has some of the oldest rocks in the world and among the oldest in North America, formed from several sections of stable craton continental crust, including the Slave Craton, Rae Craton and Hearne Craton. These rocks form the Archean and Proterozoic Precambrian basement rock of the region and are the subject of extensive research to understand continental crust and tectonic conditions on the early Earth.

== Geologic history, stratigraphy and tectonics ==
The Hearne Craton and Rae Craton are underlain by Archean metasedimentary and metavolcanic rocks. Quartz arenite in the Rae Craton has been interpreted as possible passive margin or rift deposits. Around the world, greenstone belts are a hallmark of ancient Precambrian rocks. The Ennadai-Rankin greenstone belt is the second largest in Canada and displays felsic volcanic and volcaniclastic rocks, as well as mafic rocks reaching greenschist grade on the sequence of metamorphic facies. Laminations in ironstone and pelite formations suggest that the mafic volcanic rocks deposited on the low energy slope of a volcanic plateau, away from wave action. Because of the enormous time distance from the Archean, exact interpretations are less reliable.

In the late Proterozoic, the region was affected by the Wopmay orogeny. Along the edge of the Archean Slave Craton, a 1.1 kilometre thick wedge of carbonates formed the Rocknest Formation, which thins to the east. The Slave Craton (also known as the Slave Province) is smaller than the vast neighboring Superior Province, which extends southward to the Great Lakes. By contrast with the Superior Province, the Slave Province has more sedimentary rocks, more felsic than mafic rocks, more potassium-rich granite and gold and base-metal mineralization. Geologists have inferred ancient sea floor spreading in the western part of the province from dikes and mafic lava flows, overlain by deep ocean turbidite deposits. These rocks are believed to be the remains of oceanic crust that ended up preserved, surrounded on all sides by felsic volcanic rocks and granitoid plutons. In the area of Snofleld Lake in the northern part of the Slave Province, the remains of Archean stromatolites are preserved in a dolomite unit between felsic volcanic and greywacke-mudstone turbidites, some of the earliest evidence of life, forming in the shallows around volcanic islands.

Around 1.27 billion years ago in the Proterozoic, a series of major magmatic events affected the region, referred to as "Mackenzie magmatic event," by some geologists. In the Coppermine River Province, tholeiite flood basalts emplaced at the same time over a rapid span of five million years. Strontium-neodymium-lead analysis indicates that the rocks included older, partially melted basement rocks.

In the Neoproterozoic, the four kilometre thick Mackenzie Mountains Supergroup deposited in a poorly understood basin. Hydrothermal fluids emplaced base metals into these deposits, likely during rifting that lasted into the Paleozoic.

=== Paleozoic (541-251 million years ago) ===
Marine deposition was common across much of the area in the Paleozoic. Within the Mackenzie Basin, tabulate and rugose corals grew formed the Horn Plateau Formation—a group of isolated reefs from the Devonian fed by nutrients from eroding Canadian Shield rocks and offshore upwelling in the ocean. The Selwyn Basin, which now spans into the Yukon Territory formed at the same time and accumulated graptolite fossils and bitumen.

The siliclastic, fossiliferous wackestone and mudstone of the Ordovician Bad Cache Rapids Formation record a shallow shelf environment on Southampton Island. This unit is overlain by the Ashgill Boas River Formation carbonaceous mudstone and oil shale, Churchill River Formation coral-bearing wackestone and the Sixteen Mile Brook oil shale.

=== Mesozoic (251-66 million years ago) ===
In the Mesozoic, kimberlite pipes intruded Archean basement rock in places beginning around 75 million years ago and continuing into the Cenozoic in the Ekati area.

Sedimentation continued in many areas into the Mesozoic. On Banks Island, manganese spherulites with rhodochrosite, iron-manganese oxides and dolomite mark the boundary between the Christopher and Kanguk sedimentary formations from the Cretaceous.

=== Cenozoic (66 million years ago-present) ===
In the early Cenozoic, changes in regional structural geology led to widespread erosion and fission track analysis of apatite indicates that in the Beaufort-Mackenzie area, rocks cooled from temperatures around 110 degrees Celsius after one mile of rock eroded above them in the early Eocene. The Northwest Territories was heavily glaciated during the Pleistocene. In the Mackenzie Mountains, moraine glacial till overlies older Paleogene gravel, paleosols and different till shed off of mountains.

In the vicinity of the Mackenzie River delta and Sitidgi Lake till and sediments formed into the unglaciated Eskioma Lakes area. The Mackenzie delta formed as alluvium drowned valleys. Thermokarst and an ice-cored landscape took shape in the early Holocene.

=== Gas hydrates ===
Northern Canada and the Northwest Territories are famous for gas hydrates, also known as methane clathrate—methane gas frozen in thick sediments, which might hypothetically lead to intense climate change if they melted. Recognized from bore holes, gas flow during drilling or seismic data, it was not until March and April, 1993 that samples were recovered from a 451 meter deep hole in the Mackenzie Delta.
