= Flag of the Northwest Territories =

Canadian territorial flag

Northwest Territories
- Use: Civil and state flag
- Proportion: 1:2
- Adopted: January 31, 1969

The flag of the Northwest Territories is the subnational flag of the Northwest Territories of Canada. It was adopted in 1969 by the Legislative Assembly of the Northwest Territories.

== Hudson's Bay Company flag ==
Hudson's Bay Company Flag

The NWT had no flag of its own during its early history, but the flag of the Hudson's Bay Company continued to be used at that company's forts, stores and other establishments. The Legislative Assembly of the NWT was created in 1951.

== Current flag ==
The Northwest Territories' first official flag was chosen by a special committee of the Legislative Assembly of the Northwest Territories in 1969. The committee reviewed entries from a Canada wide contest. The winner of the contest was Robert Bessant from Margaret, Manitoba.

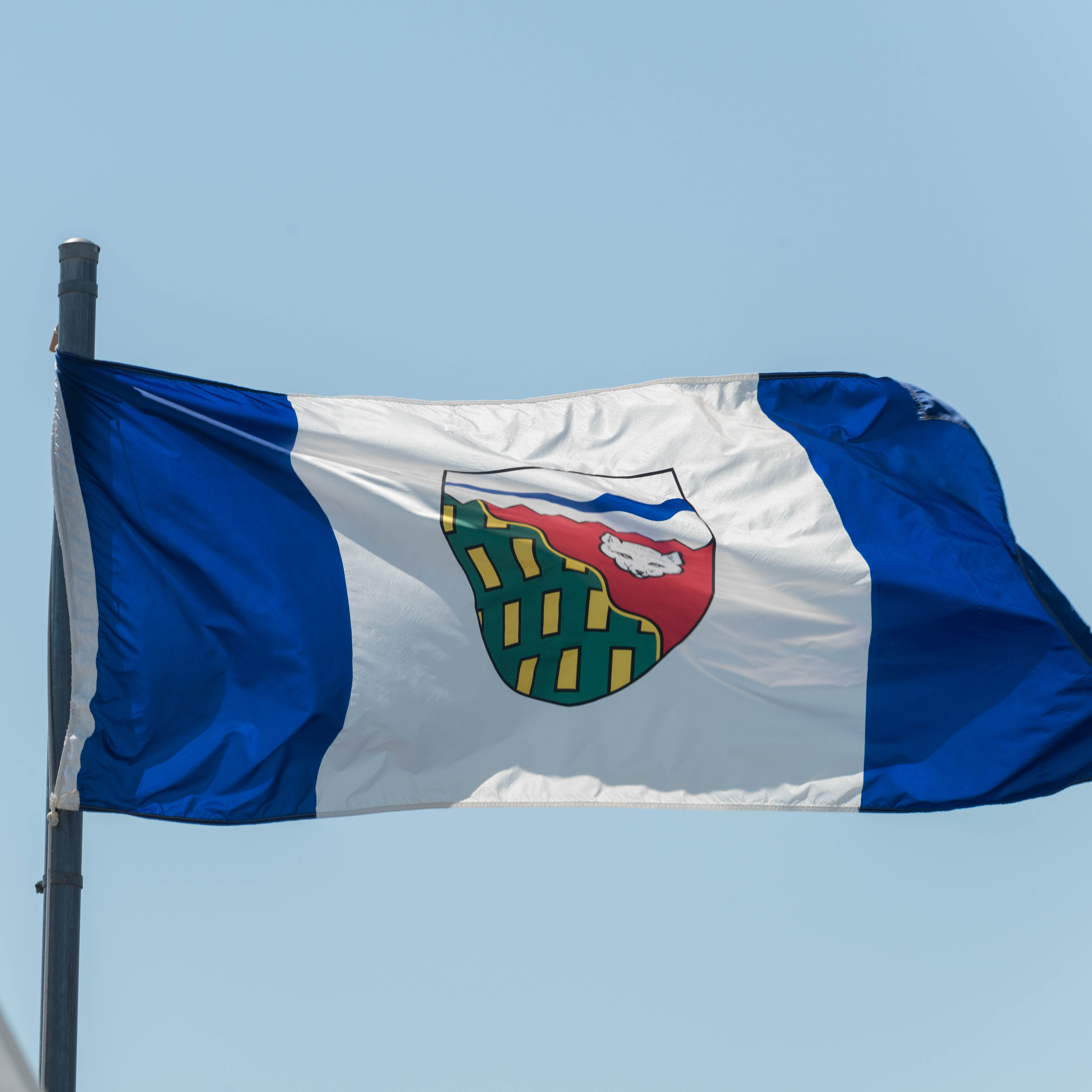
NT flag at the 2017 Canada Games

The flag features a blue field, on which is a Canadian pale (a white stripe taking up half the width of the flag), with at the centre, the shield from the coat of arms of the Northwest Territories. The blue represents the abundant waters of the territory, whereas the white represents snow and ice.

Two blue panels represent the Northwest Territories' many rivers and lakes. The white section, representing ice and snow, is equal in area to the 2 blue panels combined. The territorial Shield is centred in the white section. The white section of the Shield, with a wavy blue line dividing it, represents the Arctic Ocean and the Northwest Passage. A diagonal line, representing the tree line, divides the lower portion into a green and red section with green symbolizing the trees and red symbolizing the tundra. The gold bars in the green section and the white fox in the red section represent the abundant minerals and furs upon which the history and prosperity of the Northwest Territories has been based.

== See also ==
- Symbols of the Northwest Territories
- The Franco-Ténois flag
