= Yellowknife Historical Society =

Mining heritage society in Canada

- Established: 2002
- Location: Giant Mine Northwest Territories, Canada
- Type: Non-Profit Society
- Director: Helmut Epp
- Website: http://www.yellowknifehistory.com

The Yellowknife Historical Society, in the Northwest Territories, Canada, was first formed in 2002 as the NWT Mining Heritage Society and began planning for the creation of a mining museum for Yellowknife and the Northwest Territories and Nunavut as a whole. In 2017, the society was renamed the Yellowknife Historical Society to broaden its mandate to create a community museum for Yellowknife that would include all cultural aspects of the city's history. In March of 2024, the Yellowknife Historical Museum was opened to the public.

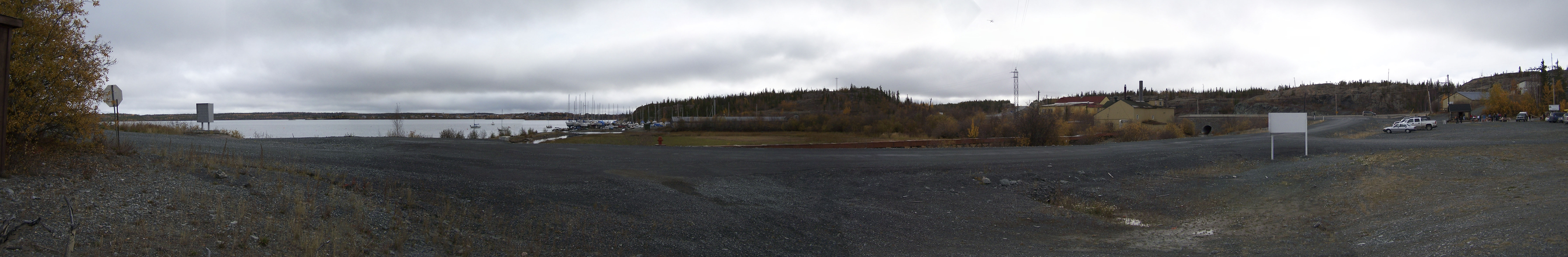
Panoramic view of future site

== Affiliations ==
The Museum is affiliated with: CMA, CHIN, and Virtual Museum of Canada.
