= Greenstone Building =

Building in Northwest Territories, Canada

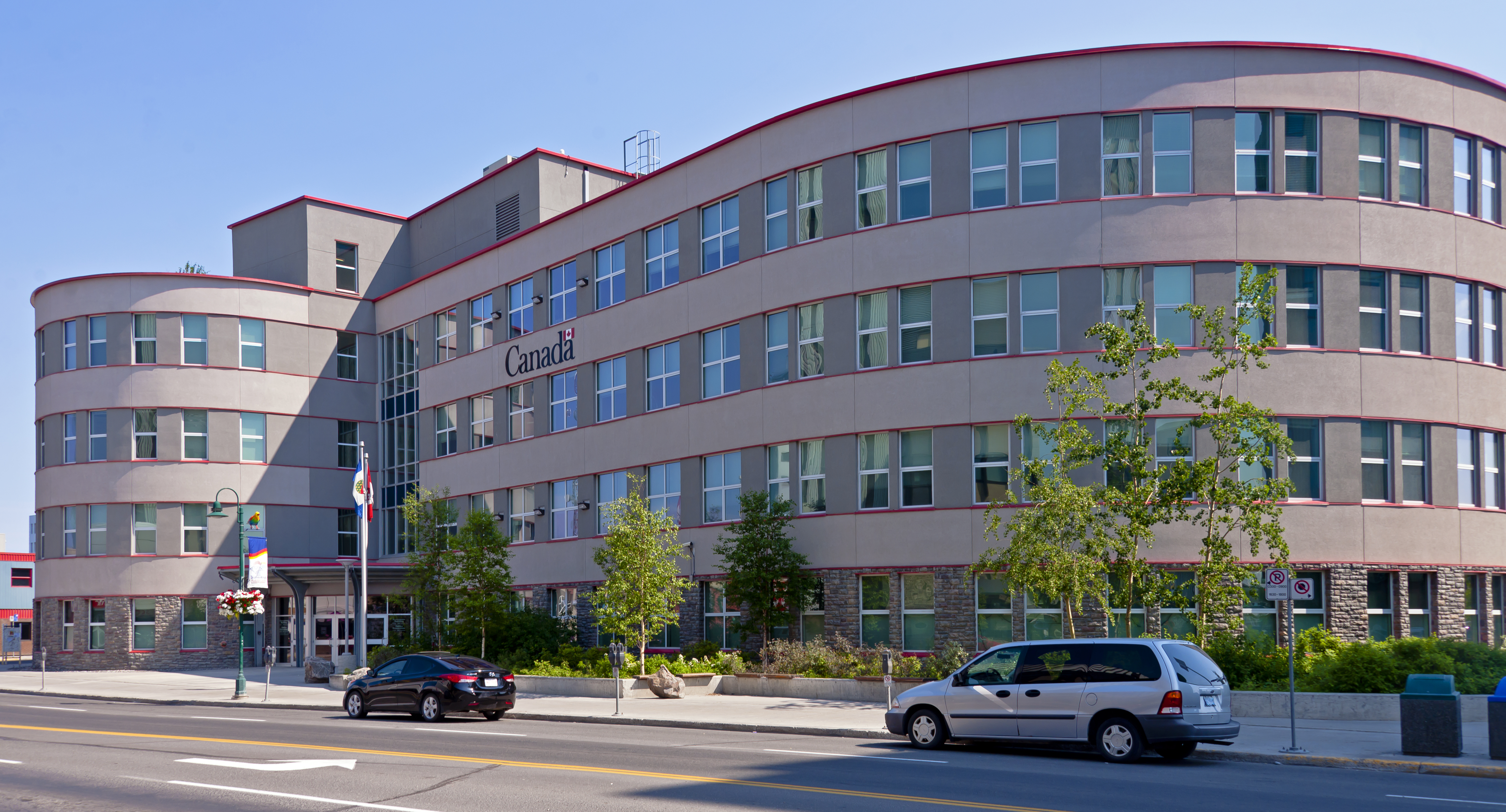
- West (front) elevation, 2015

- Location within Canada
- Etymology: From the rock under Yellowknife where the extensive gold deposits that led to the city's growth were found

General information
- Type: Office
- Location: 5101 50th Avenue, Yellowknife, NT, Canada
- Coordinates: 62.4530°N 114.3729°W
- Elevation: 190 metres (620 ft)
- Current tenants: Various Canadian government agencies
- Construction started: 2002
- Opened: 2005
- Cost: CDN$24.1 million
- Client: Public Works and Government Services Canada
- Owner: Government of Canada

Height
- Height: 16.8 metres (55 ft)

Technical details
- Structural system: reinforced concrete flat slab
- Material: Stone, glass, stucco
- Size: 1,802 square metres (19,400 sq ft)
- Floor count: 4
- Floor area: 7,300 m^{2} (79,000 sq ft)
- Grounds: 8,165 m^{2} (2.018 acres)

Design and construction
- Architecture firm: Manasc Isaac
- Engineer: Williams Engineering
- Quantity surveyor: BTY (Alberta) Ltd.
- Main contractor: PCL Construction
- Awards: Royal Architectural Institute of Canada, Innovation in Architecture Award of Excellence (2007)

The Greenstone Building, officially the Greenstone Government of Canada Building, and sometimes known as the Greenstone Government Building, is located on Franklin (50th) Avenue in downtown Yellowknife, Northwest Territories, Canada. It is a four-storey building faced in stone, completed and opened in 2005. Within are the local offices of 16 federal government agencies. Prior to the building's construction they were scattered in different buildings around the city.

The name comes from greenstone, a rock found in great quantity in the area, from which the gold that led to Yellowknife's development was extracted. The building reflects that past in two other ways. Its interior stair tower is sided in slanted boards that recall the mineshaft towers still standing, and the location of a prominent local fault beneath the building is marked on the lobby floor.

It was designed by the Edmonton firm of Manasc Isaac to be environmentally sustainable. Its central atrium has a curtain wall with photovoltaic cells, the largest such structure in Canada, and the second largest worldwide, at the time of the building's completion. Five percent of the building's electricity comes from that wall; it is used to heat water, some of which comes from the building's green roof and local groundwater, resulting in the building using half as much water as a comparably sized building. Heating efficiency is such that the building remains adequately warm during subzero winter days when many adjacent offices have to close. The building's green design reportedly saves CDN$80,000 in energy costs and reduces greenhouse gas emissions by 370 tonnes (410 short tons) each year.

Two years after its completion, on time and under budget, the Greenstone Building was recognized with LEED (Leadership in Energy and Environmental Design) Gold certification by the Canada Green Building Council. It was the first building in Northern Canada to achieve that designation, and the first LEED Gold for the architects. In 2007 the Royal Architectural Institute of Canada further honored it with an Innovation in Architecture Award of Excellence.

== Building ==
The Greenstone Building is located in the area of downtown Yellowknife referred to locally as New Town. It is on the east side of 50th Avenue, often called Franklin Avenue, a southwest–northeast thoroughfare, four lanes wide at that point, which is Yellowknife's main street. It occupies the western end of a rectangular block between 51st and 52nd streets on the north and south; 52nd Avenue is the next street to the east. The terrain is generally level, around 190 metres (620 ft) in elevation, sloping very gently down 30 metres (98 ft) to Yellowknife Bay of Great Slave Lake 800 m (a half-mile) to the east and remaining level to Frame Lake approximately 400 m (a quarter-mile) to the west.

The surrounding neighbourhood is urban. Modernist high-rise office buildings dominate this stretch of Franklin. Three of them—the Northwest Tower to the immediate south of the Greenstone Building and the Scotia Center and Precambrian Building across the street—are among the city's tallest. The Bellanca Building, once the tallest, and the 60-metre (200 ft) Centre Square Mall tower, the current champion, are within blocks. In between them the lots have single- or two-storey buildings with space for commercial use at the street level. Behind them are parking lots.

A block to the southwest is the Yellowknife campus of Aurora College and, across Franklin, the main offices of the city school district, one of its elementary schools and the log cabin schoolhouse that was the first school building in the city. A block to the west the urban development gives way to open space in the form of a park along the lake shore next to City Hall. On the north development continues for many blocks before an area of taiga and exposed Canadian Shield bedrock buffers the descent to Old Town, the original city, on a peninsula extending into the bay. East of the building, the city likewise occupies most of the space until it gives way to residential property and open space at the bay shore.

=== Exterior ===
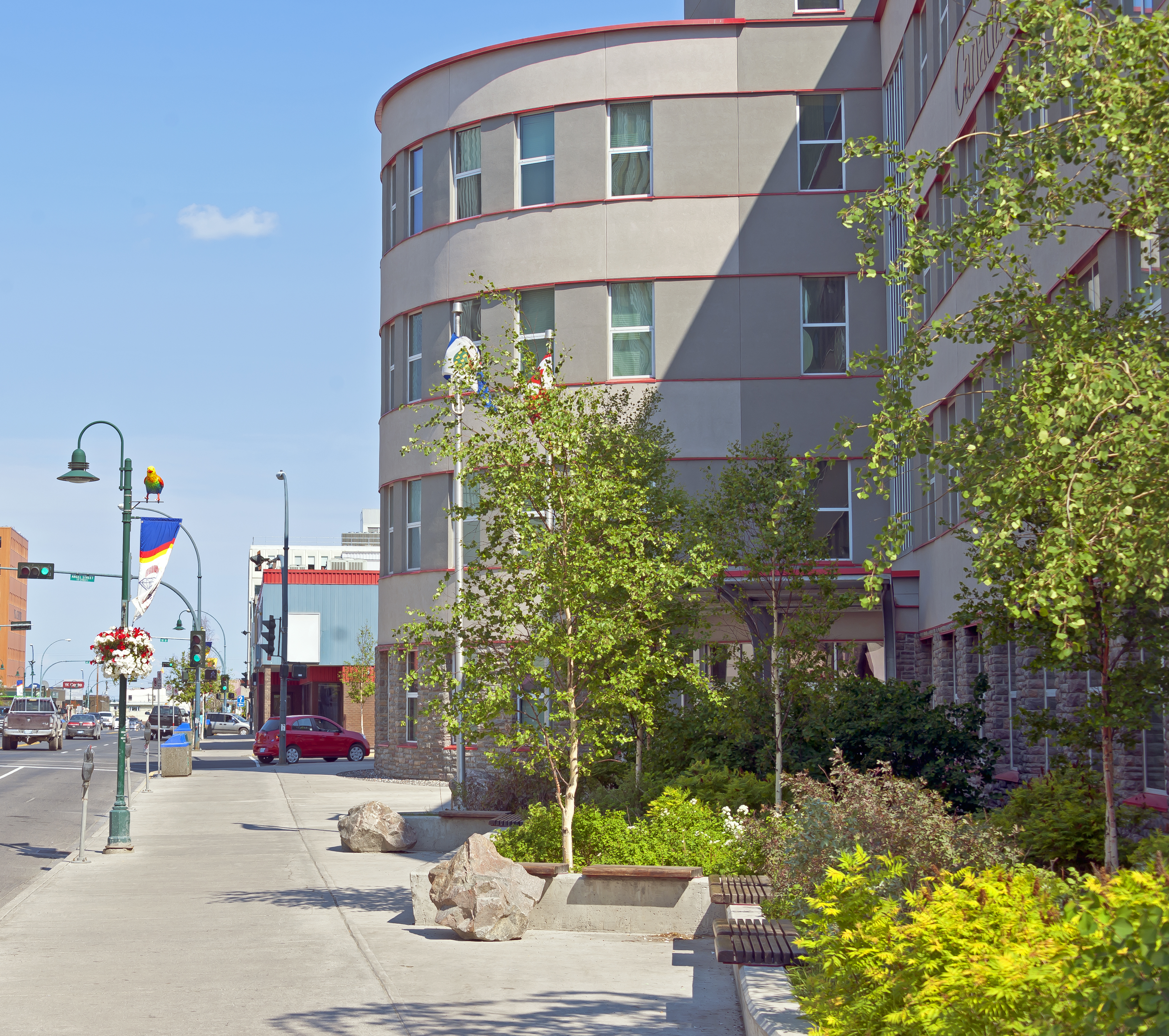
View along the north facade at street level

The building itself is composed of two sections, both four storeys in height with a flat roof, topped by a small flat-roofed structure that houses the upper end of the elevator shafts, with gardens taking up most of the space on the roofs. They are joined at the northwest corner of the lot, the southeast corner of the 51st Street intersection. It uses reinforced concrete flat slabs as its structural system. Paralleling 51st is a basically rectangular section five bays wide by 17 long. It is rounded at the corner with Franklin, allowing 10 bays on that end. The main entrance portico curves between the two sections at ground level. Joined to that block on the west is an irregularly shaped 14-bay section whose west side begins to curve south halfway towards that end of the property.

Sidewalks surround the building on three sides. In front of the longer of the two sections, along Franklin, is a planted bed with concrete walls and wooden benches. It has shrubs and some small deciduous trees that have grown to the height of the second story. A gravel path runs between them and the front of the building. Along 51st, planters set in the sidewalk hold more shrubs and trees along the entire length of the wing. A similar area planted with shrubs and flowers runs along the east facade. To the east, in the rear, is a small park with benches, grass, and more deciduous trees buffered by a concrete walkway. Beyond the park is the building's parking lot.

External image
- View of the south wall

On the rear is a 48-metre-long (157 ft) curved curtain wall between two engaged flat-roofed stair towers, connecting the far corners of both sections. It is made of glass with photovoltaic cells inside. A small secondary entrance portico is located in the center. At the building's southeast corner is an emergency exit.

The north and east facades, facing the street, have a similar treatment. The first storey is faced in rusticated stone set in mortar. All bays are set with double-pane vertical casement windows on the curved sections and large four-pane casement on the straight sections, recessed with plain red sills and lintels.

A similar red stringcourse above the windows separates the stone facing from smooth light tan stucco. It in turn is separated by another red stringcourse from a section with light brown panels and the same window treatments as the first storey. The course doubles as the sill line for the windows; another one serves as their lintels and marks off a division the same as the one below. The third storey has the same treatment. At the roofline, above another layer of tan panels, there is a plain red cornice, echoed on the top of the elevator-shaft building.

Both stair towers are faced entirely in the rusticated stone. Each has a single narrow double-pane casement window on each storey, facing south. A single narrow concrete course runs above the first and fourth storeys. The towers have the same red cornice at the roofline.

The eastern face of the north wing has a metallic framework of curved metal bars holding sections of stationary louvers. It covers all bays on the upper storeys. There are no windows on the ground level of this face.

A flat semicircular roof covers the main entrance portico on Franklin. Its wide overhanging eave, with another red cornice at the roofline, is supported by several dual steel flat-plate brackets extending to the ground. The entrance doors are aluminum and glass, set in a wall of square glass panels. The rear entrance is a smaller portico faced in rusticated stone with a red cornice, flat roof, and single door in a similar glass treatment with light fixtures flanking its upper corners.

=== Interior ===
The inside of the building is dominated by a full-height atrium, illuminated mostly by natural light coming in through the curtain wall on the south. A thick black line on the floor marks the location of the West Bay Fault beneath. All the offices within, mostly open space separated into cubicles, are located on the north, with windows looking out over the atrium and through the curtain wall. An open slanted wooden spiral staircase, echoing the many mineshaft towers in the Yellowknife area, complements the elevators in providing access. Its railing is the same red found on the exterior of the trim. On the upper storeys the space below the office windows is faced in spaced wooden flushboard similar to that used on the staircase, with random boards painted red as well.

== History ==
While the site on which Yellowknife now sits was long known to the Dene whose copper knives later gave it its name, and had been visited by European explorers in the late 18th century, it did not attract any settlement until gold was found in the greenstone belts of the Canadian Shield underlying the area. By 1936 it was a mining boomtown, and most of today's Old Town was built on the bay. Canada's entry into World War II three years later put that on hold, but after the war mining and development resumed.

=== 1953–2001: Early federal presence in Yellowknife ===
After the war the federal government, which administered the Northwest Territories directly, realized the community needed space to grow and established New Town further inland, building the city's post office there. In 1953 it allowed limited local government, and 14 years later Yellowknife was formally named the territorial capital. (Note: At the time that included what is now the separate territory of Nunavut.) This led to an influx of government workers and another economic boom.

For much of that time the heavy federal government presence in the growing city was housed wherever space could be found. A small group of houses on Glen Street, or 51st Street just north of the Greenstone Building, was known as "Government Row". One two-storey gabled wooden house was known as the Federal Building. After the 1970s it was used by the Tree of Peace organization as the Native Friendship Center.

=== 2001–2004: Design and construction ===
By the end of the 20th century the gold boom had died down and most mines had closed, although diamond mines had begun to replace them. With vacant properties all over Yellowknife, the federal government decided it was time to build a central headquarters for the many agencies that had been scattered across downtown for decades. At the end of 2001, it bought the property on Franklin between 51st and 52nd for just under CDN$2 million, then occupied by a building that had during the boom years housed Hudson's Bay and Canadian Tire retail stores.

Demolition was completed the next summer. In September, Public Works and Government Services Canada, the government's procurement agency, commissioned Edmonton architects Manasc Isaac, specialists in sustainable buildings, to design a building expected to last 75 years on the site, flexible enough to accommodate different uses should that change be necessary, with the goal of receiving silver Leadership in Energy and Environmental Design (LEED) certification from the Canada Green Building Council. Progress toward that goal started even before the new building's design was complete, with 90% of the material from the demolished Canadian Tire building recycled or otherwise diverted from landfill. During the actual construction, recycled and recyclable materials were used wherever possible; site fences were installed to control erosion that might be caused.

As part of its integrated design process, which aimed to both create an exemplary environmental building and a public space for downtown Yellowknife, Manasc Isaac sought community input. Charrettes were held in conjunction with community roundtables, where input was sought from stakeholders, and the architects in turn learned about local construction and design practices. These helped refine its goals to focus on daylighting, public space and green space in designing the new building.

This is a northern building with a northern energy, and yet it is unlike any other building in the north. More than the NWT Legislative Assembly, the Greenstone Building captures and celebrates the precious light — endless hours in the summer and brief fleeting hours in the winter: that is the north.

— Vivian Manasc, architect

The architects settled on a triangular design with an 806-square-metre (8,680 sq ft) curtain wall on the south side. This would maximize the building's exposure to the sun, especially in wintertime when Yellowknife receives as little as four hours of daylight and temperatures drop as low as −50 °C (−58 °F), allowing it to warm the atrium in the center, envisioned as a "winter room". It would also provide some electricity via 353 square metres (3,800 sq ft) of embedded solar cells, a feature made possible by a Natural Resources Canada grant program. Almost all offices in the building would be able to have some view outside, or of the atrium, as well. Artificial heat was provided by propane boilers, which emit less carbon than the fuel oil commonly used in the city during cold weather.

PCL Construction was awarded the contract, and construction began early in 2004, with a budget of $CDN28 million. For the structural system, Manasc and its consulting engineer decided to use flat concrete slabs instead of more conventional steel framing, for two reasons. First, the concrete could be produced locally. Second, it used concrete with 25% fly ash, which can reduce greenhouse gas emissions from making concrete by up to 40%. Greenstone thus became the first project in Yellowknife to use concrete made that way, establishing the capacity for further use in other construction. The frame was covered with an insulated, pressure-equalized rainscreen clad in stucco, which uses less energy in its production. To preserve the building's warmth better, triple-glazed windows were set in fiberglass frames.

Cooling the building in an environmentally conscious way was also a challenge. During the summer, Yellowknife's days get as long as its winter nights, making it the sunniest Canadian city during that season. In 20 hours of daylight with only four-hour white nights to provide respite, the overuse of air conditioning frequently leads to brownouts and as many as 50 power outages a year. The engineers compensated by adding the louvered steel shades to the south end of the building.

The cooling system was based around a high-efficiency air-cooled condensing chiller. Each office was provided with its own thermal controls, from the mechanicals of the compartmentalized four-pipe and two-pipe fan-coil underfloor air distribution system, allowing ventilated air to be warmer and cleaner, to the operable windows and shades, so that occupants could work at their own comfort levels. Occupancy sensors shut off ventilation when no one is present. If these measures worked as planned, the total cooling load capacity would be only 29 watts per square metre (2.6 per square foot), and the building would see a 45% improvement over American Society of Heating, Refrigerating and Air-Conditioning Engineers (ASHRAE) energy-use standards.

The architects made a green roof with two gardens, the second such roof in the city, part of the design. This both made it attractive as green space for workers to relax in on breaks and served to retain some of the rainwater that fell on it in a 13,000-litre (3,400 US gal) tank for non-potable uses such as watering the landscaping instead of letting it flow into the sewers. PCL was able to incorporate potentially problematic groundwater found during construction into the supply for the building's washrooms, which were further equipped with waterless urinals and dual flush toilets to reduce usage. Solar power was used to heat water. Total potable water consumption was estimated to be 153 litres per square meter (5.1 gallons per square foot), about two-thirds of the LEED baseline.

The interior finishings were also chosen for their minimal environmental impact. Instead of rolled carpets, floors were surfaced in tiled carpet with a high percentage of recycled content to reduce waste material during the laying process. The floor itself was made of partially recycled composite materials with no urea or formaldehyde. Paints and adhesives with low volatile organic content were used to ensure good indoor air quality.

Construction went well enough that the designers raised their LEED certification target level to gold. The only significant aspect of the building to fall short of original expectations was the photovoltaics in the curtain wall. They had to be manufactured by the French company Saint-Gobain S.A. and shipped to Yellowknife preassembled since there were no workers there who could do that. One of the planned bands of cells had to be abandoned when the euro appreciated enough against the Canadian dollar during construction as to make its cost prohibitive.

=== 2005–present: Opening and use ===
The building was completed not only on schedule by shortly after mid-2005, but for $24.1 million, almost $4 million under budget. A committee formed to decide on a name chose Greenstone, from the greenstone belts underlying the city and its surrounding bush, which had been a foundation not only in the literal sense as the city's bedrock but metaphorically, as they had contained the gold that had led to its growth and prosperity. It had been suggested by David Tilden, a hazardous materials specialist with Environment Canada, one of the agencies to locate in the building. "Rocks are what Yellowknife is all about," he said.

Committee chair The Rev. John Sperry, former Anglican Bishop of the Arctic, said the committee agreed. "We all felt it represented Northern life." It also relieved the committee of having to choose to honour one person over another, as it had originally expected to. The "green" in the name also acknowledged the new building's environmental friendliness. In recognition of the name's geological origins, the location of the West Bay Fault beneath the building is marked on the lobby floor.

The building was formally opened on October 14, 2005. Officials from all levels of government spoke at the ceremony. "As one of the most energy-efficient buildings in the country, the Greenstone Building is an example of Canada's commitment to protecting the environment," said Ethel Blondin-Andrew, then the federal Minister of State (Northern Development). She touted the estimated $30,000 savings to taxpayers in annual energy costs the building was expected to realize.

Northwest Territories premier Joe Handley expressed his belief that the new building would help his government work better with their federal counterparts. "When I'm here, I'm in Ottawa," he said. The city's deputy mayor, Wendy Bisaro, said the Greenstone Building would be "a wonderful addition to our downtown." First Nations elements were also included, with a Dene blessing and a Haida drumming ceremony. Most of the 15 agencies and their 200 employees moved in shortly afterwards. Several meeting rooms were made available for the use of community groups after hours.

==== Reception ====
Shortly after its opening, it was certified LEED Basic Silver, the first building in Northern Canada to achieve any level of LEED certification. The Royal Architectural Institute of Canada, when it recognized the building with its Excellence Award for Innovation in Architecture in early 2007, noted that the photovoltaic array on the curtain wall, the second-largest in Canada at the time of its construction, generated 33.5 kWh of electricity annually, about 5% of the building's total energy needs (during the first full year of the building's operations, this actually worked out to 19%). It was "admirable that the designers and clients were willing to take risks in innovations in a challenging project," the jury said.

Later in 2007 the Canada Green Building Council upgraded it to LEED Gold, again the first time that recognition had been granted to a building in the North. The council credited the Greenstone Building with 42 of a possible 70 points. Of those, it was found to be the most successful in water efficiency, earning all of the five possible points in that area. It also did well in innovation and design, with four out of five, and indoor environmental quality, at 10 of 15. Materials and resources was its weakest area, with only four of 14 earned. It was the first LEED Gold building for the architects.

In 2009 Keith Halliday, an economics columnist at the Yukon News in Whitehorse, capital of the neighbouring Yukon Territory, considered the Greenstone Building's costs and benefits after that territory's government announced its intention to build all its new buildings to LEED standards. While he noted that the construction costs of the building (Note: He used $18 million as the basis for this calculation.) worked out to $2,500 per square metre, $500 higher than the Canadian average, that was not so much when the additional costs of building in the North and government project management requirements were factored in. He was amused by the use of occupancy sensors to manage ventilation. "In an old joke come true, there is also an elaborate system to capture the hot air generated at government meetings."

==== Post-occupancy evaluation ====
Several years after the building opened, Manasc Isaac undertook a post-occupancy evaluation to find out how it had performed, and what could be learned for future projects. Data was collected about the building's performance from SNC-Lavalin, which had been contracted by the government to operate the building. Federal employees in the building were invited to complete a web-based survey on their impressions and comments, which 37% did.

The architects still regretted the loss of the extra band of solar cells on the curtain wall. In the future, they suggested, hedging against unexpected currency fluctuations should be done whenever a project depended in part at least on an imported component. "Having Canadian capacity for manufacturing would have been even better."

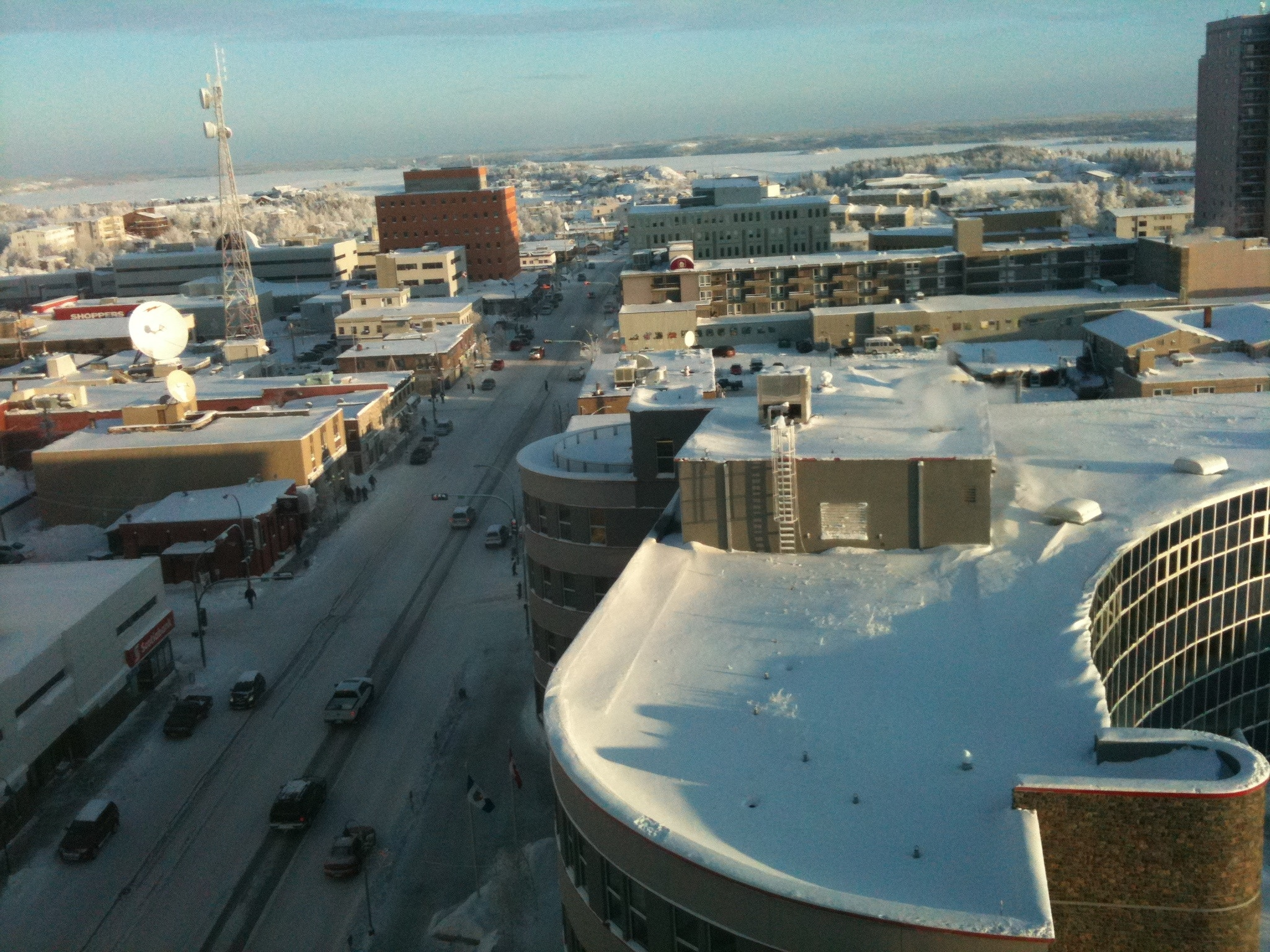
The Greenstone's roof from the neighbouring Northwest Tower in wintertime

The building's expected low utility usage profile was a reality. It had used 0.39 gigajoules (GJ) of energy per square meter during the 2008 fiscal year. That was more than the 0.22 GJ/m^{2} target of the design model and the 0.3 GJ/m^{2} in Canada's Model National Energy Code for Buildings, but those levels were not meant to be predictive. Anecdotal accounts suggested the building's heating was working well: even in outdoor winter temperatures of −50 °C (−58 °F), cold enough that many businesses in Yellowknife send employees home, the Greenstone Building remained warm enough that workers there could continue in their duties comfortably. In the summertime, SNC had learned to start the chiller before other buildings did, in order to avoid brownouts.

In some months, the solar cells in the curtain wall actually outperformed their target, generating over 2,500 kWh during March and April. This was credited to light reflecting off snow cover. During summer it fell down to below 500.

During fiscal 2008, the building's metered water consumption was 830.14 cubic metres (219,300 US gal), for a monthly average of 69.2 cubic metres (18,300 US gal). This was higher than the design estimate of 601.3 cubic metres (158,800 US gal), but still far below 1,595.4 cubic metres (421,500 US gal), the reference measure for a building that size. Thus, despite falling short of the design target, "[t]he Greenstone Building still uses only 52% of the water of a comparable building," the evaluation said.

Respondents to the survey said they mostly found the building pleasant. They gave its daylighting their highest marks. "I prefer the natural light whenever it is available," one said in comments, "and have a tendency to turn off the lights in the office when the sun is shining in through the atrium glass wall," although two-thirds said they still used task lighting. Three-quarters said they made use of the window blinds to regulate the daylight in their offices. Almost half said their access to it was excellent.

Conversely, the two most problematic areas were personal thermal comfort and conversational privacy. Despite overwhelming use of the windows (which they admitted helped keep the air fresh) and location-specific thermal controls, almost half rated their ability to reach their personally desired level as "less than adequate." Manasc Isaac noted that the building operator was attempting to address that.

"Noise levels are high due to reflected sound and lack of sound dampening," one commenter said. Respondents who worked in open areas, particularly cubicles, reported more dissatisfaction with this aspect of the building than those who worked in private offices. Almost 70% said their ability to hold conversations without others overhearing was less than adequate.

== Tenants ==
The Greenstone Building currently has offices of the following federal agencies:

- Aboriginal Affairs and Northern Development Canada
- Canada Border Services Agency
- Canada School of Public Service
- Canadian Heritage
- Citizenship and Immigration Canada
- Correctional Service of Canada
- Department of Justice
- Employment and Social Development Canada
- Health Canada
- Industry Canada
- National Energy Board
- Natural Resources Canada
- Parks Canada
- Royal Canadian Mounted Police (Note: This is in addition to the RCMP's local headquarters building two blocks to the west next to Yellowknife's City Hall)
- Statistics Canada
- Public Works and Government Services Canada

== Awards ==
Manasc Isaac won three awards for the Greenstone Building:

- Consulting Engineers of Alberta, Award of Merit (2006)
- Athena Institute, Brilliant Building Award (2006)
- Royal Architectural Institute of Canada, Innovation in Architecture Award of Excellence (2007).

== See also ==
- City of Calgary Water Centre, first LEED Gold building in Alberta, also designed by Manasc Isaac
- Green building in Canada
