= Canadian Home Builders' Association =

Canadian not-for-profit organization

The Canadian Home Builders' Association (CHBA) is a not-for-profit organization representing residential construction and related industry firms in Canada. It was founded in 1943, following closely the adoption of the National Building Code of Canada in 1941, and today claims a membership of over 9000. The organization represents member interests to local, provincial and federal governments, and develops positions and solutions to support technical currency and solution pathways for members. Member companies include home builders and renovators, land developers, trade contractors, product and material manufacturers, building product suppliers, lending institutions, insurance providers, and service professionals.

CHBA provides information to new home buyers and home owners to understand processes, planning and regulations surrounding home ownership. CHBA is a resource for locating contractors for new builds or renovations, and working through safety standards, insurance and warranty issues.

== Net Zero Council ==
CHBA’s Net Zero Energy Housing Council (NZC) stated goal is to support innovation in the industry, creating a market advantage for CHBA member builders and renovators pursuing Net Zero Energy building performance. The Council was established in 2014 as a response to growing interest in energy responsibility from home builders and prospective home owners. The Net Zero program comes out of the previous EnviroHome program established in 1994 as a marketing tool to promote the R-2000 energy efficiency and building waste reduction building standard. EnviroHome promotion was a joint effort by CHBA and TD Canada Trust. The R-2000 program is itself a collaboration between CHBA and Natural Resources Canada (NRCan), established as a building standard in 1982 and updated in 2012.

== Publications ==
CHBA publishes Building Excellence quarterly print magazine and associated industry news portal and a blog.

CHBA also publishes the national CHBA Builders' Manual and its compendium text, the CHBA Renovators' Manual.

In addition, the Association publishes several topical ePublications and archived webinars for members only. CHBA hosts a YouTube channel with a variety of webinars, contractor introductions, award ceremonies, government lobbying and other content targeted to consumers and builder/contractors.

== Published studies ==
CHBA publishes a number of studies every year, most of which are available to members only. The CHBA Home Buyer Preference Survey, published annually starting in 2015, is one such document. A select few documents are available to the public from CHBA:

- Municipal Benchmarking Study, September 2020.
- Residential Construction in Canada: Economic Performance Review 2019 with 2020 Insights, September 2020
- Other older annual reports, studies, and position papers may be found on provincial and local CHBA websites and through public archives.

== Structure ==
CHBA has nine active council and committee bodies:

- Board of Directors – responsible for the overall governance of the Association;
- Canadian Renovators' Council – professional interests of CHBA’s renovator members;
- Executive Committee – oversee the ongoing direction of CHBA on the Board’s behalf;
- Executive Officers' Council – senior staff members from local, provincial and national levels of the Association;
- Modular Construction Council – support the increasing role of factory-built modular construction in the building industry. (This council was jointly formed in 2017 by members of the Canadian Manufactured Housing Institute and MHICanada);
- Net Zero Energy Housing Council – established in 2014 to help members create a market advantage for Net Zero Energy Building performance;
- Technical Research Committee – forum for building codes, standards and regulations affecting how homes are constructed and resolve issues where new technology and prior processes conflict;
- Urban Council – issues affecting community growth: municipal infrastructure investment; new home taxes, fees, levies and charges; development regulations; and residential development and community prosperity.

== Provincial associations ==
CHBA has provincial umbrella associations with several local associations.

- CHBA-British Columbia: Central Interior, Central Okanogan, South Okanagan, Vancouver Island, Fraser valley, Northern British Columbia, Sea-to-Sky, Homebuilders Association Vancouver (HAVAN)];
- BILD Alberta: Calgary, Central, Grande Prairie, Lethbridge, Wood Buffalo, Edmonton (CHBA), Edmonton (UDI), Medicine Hat (CHBA), Lakeland;
- Saskatchewan: Regina], Saskatoon
- Manitoba HBA
- Ontario HBA: BILD (Greater Toronto Area), Brantford, Chatham-Kent, Durham Region, Greater Dufferin, Greater Ottawa, Grey-Bruce (HBTA), Guelph and District, Haldimand-Norfolk, Haliburton County, Kingston Frontenac, Lanark Leeds, London, Niagara, North Bay, Peterborough and the Kawarthas, Quinte, Sarnia-Lambton, Simcoe County, St. Thomas and Elgin, Stratford and Area, Sudbury and District, Thunder Bay, Waterloo Region, West End Home Builders' Association, Windsor Essex;
- CHBA-New Brunswick: Moncton HBA
- CHBA-Nova Scotia
- CHBA-PEI
- Newfoundland and Labrador

== Past presidents ==
All past presidents of CHBA are members of the Past Presidents' Advisory Council, and the council is chaired by the immediate past president.

- 1943: Kenneth Green, Ottawa
- 1944: Joseph L.E. Price, Montreal
- 1945–46: Frank R. Lount, Winnipeg
- 1947–48: Hon. George Prudham, Edmonton
- 1949: John A. Griffin, Richmond Hill
- 1950–51: Frank A. Mager
- 1952: William H. Grisenwaite, Hamilton
- 1953–54: Gordon S. Shipp, Mississauga
- 1955–56: Harry J. Long, Toronto
- 1957: Lesley E. Wade, Calgary
- 1958–59: Maurice Joubert, Laval
- 1960: Campbell C. Holmes, Toronto
- 1961: Graham Lount, Winnipeg
- 1962: William M. McCance, Toronto
- 1963: Chesley J. McConnel, Edmonton
- 1964: Ernest R. Alexander, Barrie
- 1965: Charles B. Campbell, Hamilton
- 1966: Jean-Yves Gelinas, Montreal
- 1967: William G. Connelly, Ottawa
- 1968: Edward L. Mayotte, Thunder Bay
- 1969: Ralph T. Scurfield, Calgary
- 1970: S. Eric Johnson, Mississauga
- 1971: Harold G. Shipp, Mississauga
- 1972: C. Donald Wilson, Calgary
- 1973: H. Keith Morley, Toronto
- 1974: Ernest W. Assaly, Ottawa
- 1975: Bernard Denault, Laval
- 1976: Howard E. Ross, Calgary
- 1977: H. Eric J. Bergman, Winnipeg
- 1978: William E. Small, Mississauga
- 1979: Keith G. Paddick, Edmonton
- 1980: George P. Frieser, Edmonton
- 1981: Klaus Springer, Calgary
- 1982: Ctril Morgoan, St. John's
- 1983: Robert Flitton, Vancouver
- 1984: John B. Sandusky, Toronto
- 1985: Albert Defehr, Winnipeg
- 1986: Robert Shaw, Halifax
- 1987: Norman Godfrey, Toronto
- 1988: Gary Santini, Vancouver
- 1989: Thomas Cochren, Hamilton
- 1990: Gordon Thompson, Toronto
- 1991: Gary Reardon, St. John's
- 1992: John Bassel, Toronto
- 1993: Bill Strain, Vancouver
- 1995: Ted Bryk, Orangeville
- 1995: Bruse Clemmensen, Toronto
- 1996: Jerry Roehr, Winnipeg
- 1997: Bob McLaughlin, Quispamsis
- 1998: Lewis Makatsui, Edmonton
- 1999: Garnet Kindervater, St. John's
- 2000: Ken Sawatsky, Delta
- 2001: Dick Miller, Halifax
- 2002: Greg Christenson, Edmonton
- 2003: Jim Thompson, Kamloops
- 2004: Mary Lawson, Orangeville
- 2005: David Wassmansdorf, Burlington
- 2006: Dave Benbow, Thorsby
- 2007: Richard Lind, Bridgewater
- 2008: John Hrynkow, Edmonton
- 2009: Gary Friend, Surrey
- 2010: Victor Fiume
- 2019: Stefanie Coleman, St. Thomas

== See also ==
- R-2000 program
- Passive house
- Canada Green Building Council
- National Building Code of Canada
