= Green building in Canada =

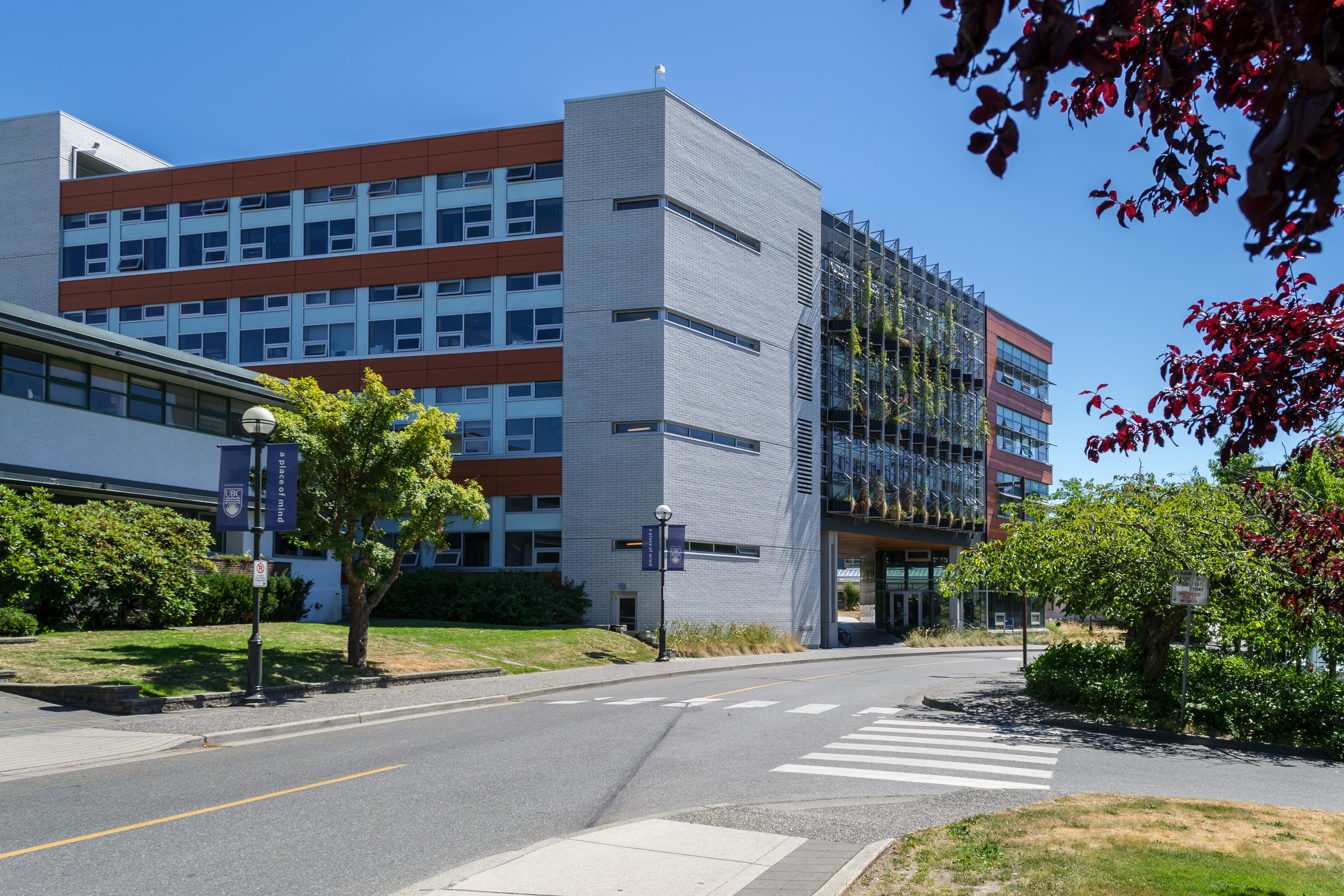
Centre for Interactive Research on Sustainability, University of British Columbia. LEED Platinum Certified Building. Completed in 2011. 2260 West Mall, Vancouver, Canada

Green building in Canada refers to the design, construction, and operation of Canadian buildings with a focus on sustainability, energy efficiency, and reduced environmental impact on the Canadian environment.

The practice has developed in response to concerns about climate change, resource consumption, and urban development in Canada.

Various initiatives, including policies, regulations and third-party certification systems such as Leadership in Energy and Environmental Design (LEED) and the Canadian Green Building Council (CaGBC) influence the adoption of green building practices across the country.

The Canadian government, along with provincial and municipal authorities, has implemented various evolving strategies like advancements in materials, energy systems, and building technologies to support sustainable construction, including financial incentives, updated building codes, and emissions reduction targets.

This article provides an overview of green building in Canada, including its policies, certification programs, notable projects, ongoing challenges, affordability, and design strategies.

== Background ==
The development of green building practices in Canada has been shaped by evolving environmental awareness, advancements in building science, and government initiatives. Early discussions on sustainability in construction were influenced by broader environmental movements and research on energy efficiency and climate-responsive design. Over time, the focus on reducing energy consumption and minimizing environmental impact led to the introduction of policies and programs aimed at improving building performance.

In response to rising energy costs and environmental concerns, Canada introduced initiatives such as the R-2000 Home Program in the late 1980s to promote energy-efficient residential construction. Throughout the following decades, additional programs expanded to address commercial buildings, indoor air quality, and the use of sustainable materials. These efforts contributed to the development of national standards and policies supporting energy efficiency and emissions reduction in the building sector.

In March 2006, Canada's first green building point of service, Light House Sustainable Building Centre, opened on Granville Island in the heart of Vancouver, BC. A destination for the public and professionals alike, the Light House resource centre is funded by Canadian government departments and businesses to help implement green building practices and to recognize the economic value of green building as a new regional economy.

== Government Policies and Initiatives ==
=== Federal Strategies ===
The Government of Canada has implemented several strategies to promote green building practices and transition towards a net-zero emissions future. These initiatives aim to enhance energy efficiency, reduce greenhouse gas emissions, and improve the resilience of the building sector.

==== Canada Green Building Strategy ====
The Canada Green Buildings Strategy (CGBS) is a federal initiative aimed at making homes and buildings across the country more energy-efficient, affordable, and resilient to climate change. The strategy focuses on three main areas consisting of accelerating retrofits, building green from the start, and shaping the future of the buildings sector. It promotes the use of cleaner energy sources for heating and cooling, encourages sustainable construction materials, and supports measures to protect buildings from extreme weather. The goal is to improve energy efficiency while addressing housing affordability and economic growth.

==== Key Programs ====
The federal government has introduced several programs to support greener buildings. The Canada Greener Homes Grant and Canada Greener Homes Loan help homeowners make energy-efficient upgrades. The Oil to Heat Pump Affordability Program provides support for switching to cleaner heating systems. The Green and Inclusive Community Buildings Program funds energy-efficient retrofits for public buildings, while the Greening Government Strategy focuses on making federal buildings more sustainable. These initiatives involve collaboration with provinces, municipalities, Indigenous communities, and private sector partners to drive progress toward a low-carbon, climate-resilient future.

=== Provincial and Municipal ===
==== Green Municipal Fund ====
The Green Municipal Fund (GMF) is a program administered by the Federation of Canadian Municipalities (FCM) that provides financial support for environmental projects undertaken by municipal governments in Canada. Funded by the Government of Canada, the program offers grants, loans, and loan guarantees to assist municipalities in initiatives that focus on improving air, water, and soil quality, as well as reducing greenhouse gas emissions. The GMF supports projects at various stages, including planning, feasibility studies, pilot initiatives, and full-scale capital projects.

Eligibility for GMF funding includes municipal governments, municipally owned corporations, non-profit affordable housing providers, and municipal partners such as private sector entities, Indigenous communities, and non-governmental organizations. The application process differs depending on each of the 2 primary funding streams, with Community Efficiency Financing (CEF) projects requiring a two-stage process and Sustainable Affordable Housing (SAH) projects allowing continuous application intake. The GMF is structured to provide financial and technical support to municipalities working toward sustainability and environmental resilience.

==== R-2000 & EnerGuide ====
Natural Resources Canada (NRCan) implemented the voluntary R-2000 Home Program 1982 service organizations and certified professionals across the country to enhance construction building codes to increase energy efficiency and promote sustainability. Homes meeting the standard must comply with energy performance requirements that go beyond conventional building codes, with a focus on air quality, insulation, and efficiency in heating and cooling systems. The program has been updated several times to reflect changes in building science and technology. In 1995, technical requirements were advised to lower energy consumption targets and introduce indoor air quality and environmental considerations. Further updates, such as those in 2012, incorporate stricter energy efficiency measures and additional performance criteria like and not limited to enhanced air tightness, improved ventilation systems, stringent insulation requirements, advanced window performance.

A feature that functions alongside the R-2000 home program to assess its efficiency is the EnerGuide rating service. This service is available across Canada, allows home builders and home buyers to measure and rate the performance of their homes, and confirm that those specifications have been met.

Regional initiatives based on R-2000 include Energy Star for New Homes, Built Green, Novoclimat, GreenHome, Power Smart for New Homes, and GreenHouse.

== Green Architecture and Design Practices In Canada ==
=== Sustainable Building Materials ===
Sustainable building materials are increasingly used in Canadian architecture to reduce environmental impact and improve energy efficiency. These materials are selected based on factors such as low embodied carbon, recyclability, energy performance, and local availability. Common materials include reclaimed wood, recycled steel, hempcrete, cork, bamboo, and high-efficiency insulation products, which help minimize resource extraction and landfill waste.

Adaptive reuse of existing buildings is also a growing practice in Canadian green architecture, as it conserves materials, reduces demolition waste, and preserves the embodied energy in older structures.

Designers are also exploring newer alternatives such as wood-based panels, magnesium oxide boards, and bio-based products to support healthier indoor air quality and building durability. The growth of sustainable construction practices is being driven by shifting consumer expectations, regulatory changes, and increased awareness of climate-related risks. Canadian firms are also responding to trends like prefabrication and modular design, which support waste reduction and improved material efficiency.

=== Passive Design Strategies ===
Passive design strategies are increasingly used in Canadian architecture to enhance building performance and reduce energy consumption by leveraging climate-responsive features. Architects often orient buildings to maximize solar gain in winter and minimize overheating in summer through shading and window placement. High-performance insulation, airtight construction, and thermal mass are integrated into designs to maintain indoor comfort without heavy reliance on mechanical systems.

In coastal or temperate regions, passive ventilation and natural cooling techniques are used to address humidity and airflow concerns. These strategies are large factor to net-zero energy building design in Canada, where the goal is to minimize energy demand and meet the remaining energy needs through renewable sources such as solar panels. Architects incorporating passive design principles aim to align with national and provincial standards promoting energy-efficient and low-carbon construction across diverse Canadian climates.

== Canadian Green Building Certification Programs ==
=== LEED Canada ===
The Canada Green Building Council (CaGBC), established in 2002, obtained a license from the U.S. Green Building Council in 2003 to adapt LEED for use in Canada. This adaptation built on earlier Canadian efforts such as BREEAM-Canada, introduced in 1996 by the Canadian Standards Association, which helped shape the early structure and credit categories of the original LEED system.

LEED certification in Canada evaluates buildings based on several criteria, including energy efficiency, water conservation, indoor environmental quality, and sustainable materials. Projects are awarded certification at one of four levels—Certified, Silver, Gold, or Platinum—based on the number of points achieved within the rating system. Certification is available for a variety of building types, such as new construction, existing buildings, commercial interiors, and residential homes.

The CaGBC continues to oversee LEED certification in Canada and maintains resources and guidance tailored to local building codes and climate considerations. Canada remains one of the most active countries outside the United States for LEED-certified space.

=== BOMA BEST ===
BOMA BEST (Building Environmental Standards) is a national certification program administered by BOMA Canada that evaluates the environmental performance and management of existing buildings in Canada. Introduced in 2005 as a replacement for the Go Green and Go Green Plus programs, the initiative provides a framework for assessing sustainability practices across multiple building types, including offices, retail spaces, industrial sites, and multi-unit residential buildings.

The program certifies buildings at five levels—Baseline, Bronze, Silver, Gold, and Platinum—based on a building’s compliance with best practices and performance across categories such as energy, water, waste, emissions, and occupant well-being. In 2023, BOMA Canada launched BOMA BEST Sustainable 4.0 and BOMA BEST Smart, reflecting updated priorities such as decarbonization, health, and digital integration.

As of 2024, thousands of buildings across Canada have received BOMA BEST certification, making it one of the country’s most widely used environmental assessment programs for existing buildings.

=== BREEAM ===
BREEAM (Building Research Establishment Environmental Assessment Method) is one of the world's oldest green building certification systems, originally developed in the United Kingdom in 1990 by the Building Research Establishment (BRE). Although it is not a Canadian-specific program, BREEAM has influenced the development of Canadian standards and has been used selectively for projects in Canada, particularly for clients with global portfolios or in partnership with international developers.

BREEAM evaluates buildings across several sustainability categories, including energy, water, materials, pollution, waste, and management practices. The system assigns ratings ranging from Pass to Outstanding, based on a point-based assessment tailored to building type and project goals. While not as widely adopted in Canada as LEED or BOMA BEST, BREEAM remains a globally recognized benchmark that supports the design and operation of high-performing green buildings.

== Notable green buildings ==
- VanDusen Botanical Garden Visitor Centre
- Beamish-Munro Hall at Queen's University features sustainable construction methods such as high fly-ash concrete, triple-glazed windows, dimmable fluorescent lights and a grid-tied photovoltaic array.
- Gene H. Kruger Pavilion at Laval University uses largely nonpolluting, nontoxic, recycled and renewable materials as well as advanced bioclimatic concepts that reduce energy consumption by 25% compared with a concrete building of the same dimensions. The structure of the building is made entirely out of wood products, thus further reducing the environmental impact of the building.
- The Greenstone Building, which houses federal government offices in Yellowknife, capital of the Northwest Territories, became the first LEED Gold certified building in Northern Canada in 2007.
- The City of Calgary Water Centre officially opened June 4, 2008 at the Manchester Centre with a minimum Green Building Council of Canada’s Gold LEED (Leadership in Energy and Environmental Design) level certification. The 183,000-square-foot (17,000 m^{2}) office building is 95 per cent day lit, conserves energy and water and fosters a productive, healthy environment for visitors and employees alike.
- Rodeo Fine Homes development in Newmarket, Ontario is first in Canada to be built entirely to LEED platinum eco-standard. The 34 homes in the EcoLogic development by Rodeo Fine Homes will use at least 50 per cent less water, have 35 per cent fewer discharge flows and generate 60 per cent less solid waste, greenhouse gas production and energy consumption than conventional homes. Local suppliers are featured, such as Forest Stewardship Council certified lumber from Kott Lumber in Stouffville and Mississauga cabinet manufacturer Aya produced the urea formaldehyde-free EVO cabinetry.

== See also ==
- Energy in Canada
- Green building
- Sustainable Architecture
- LEED
