= R2000 =

R2000 or R-2000 might refer to:

- R2000 (microprocessor), a microprocessor developed by MIPS Computer Systems
- Pratt & Whitney R-2000, an aircraft engine
- R-2000 program, a Natural Resources Canada program for the construction of energy efficient homes
- Robin R2000, a French aircraft
