= Gordon S. Shipp =

Canadian speculative and custom home builder

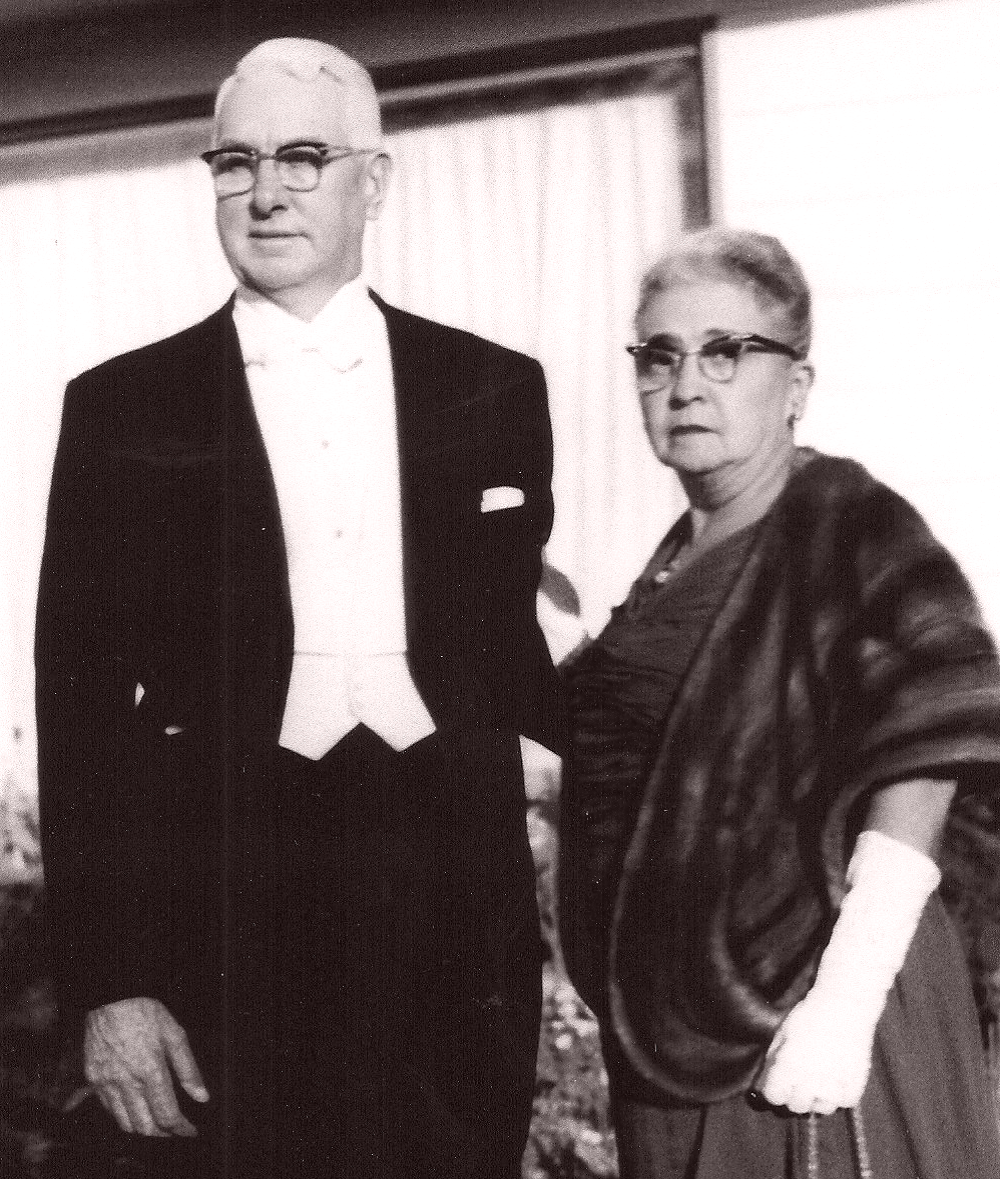
Shipp with his wife.

Gordon Stanley Shipp (1891-1981) was a Canadian speculative and custom home builder. He founded his firm in 1923 when he moved from western Ontario, where he was a farmer.

He later became the president of the Canadian Home Builders' Association.

== Personal life ==
He married Bessie Louella Breeze and they had two children. He is the father of Harold Shipp.
