= Vivian Manasc =

Canadian architect

- Born: 1956 (age 69–70); Bucharest, Romania
- Occupation: Architect

Vivian Manasc (born 1956) is a Canadian architect.

== Early life and education ==
Born in Bucharest, Romania, Manasc moved to Canada with her parents in her childhood. She graduated from McGill University in Montreal, Quebec with a Bachelor of Architecture degree in 1980.

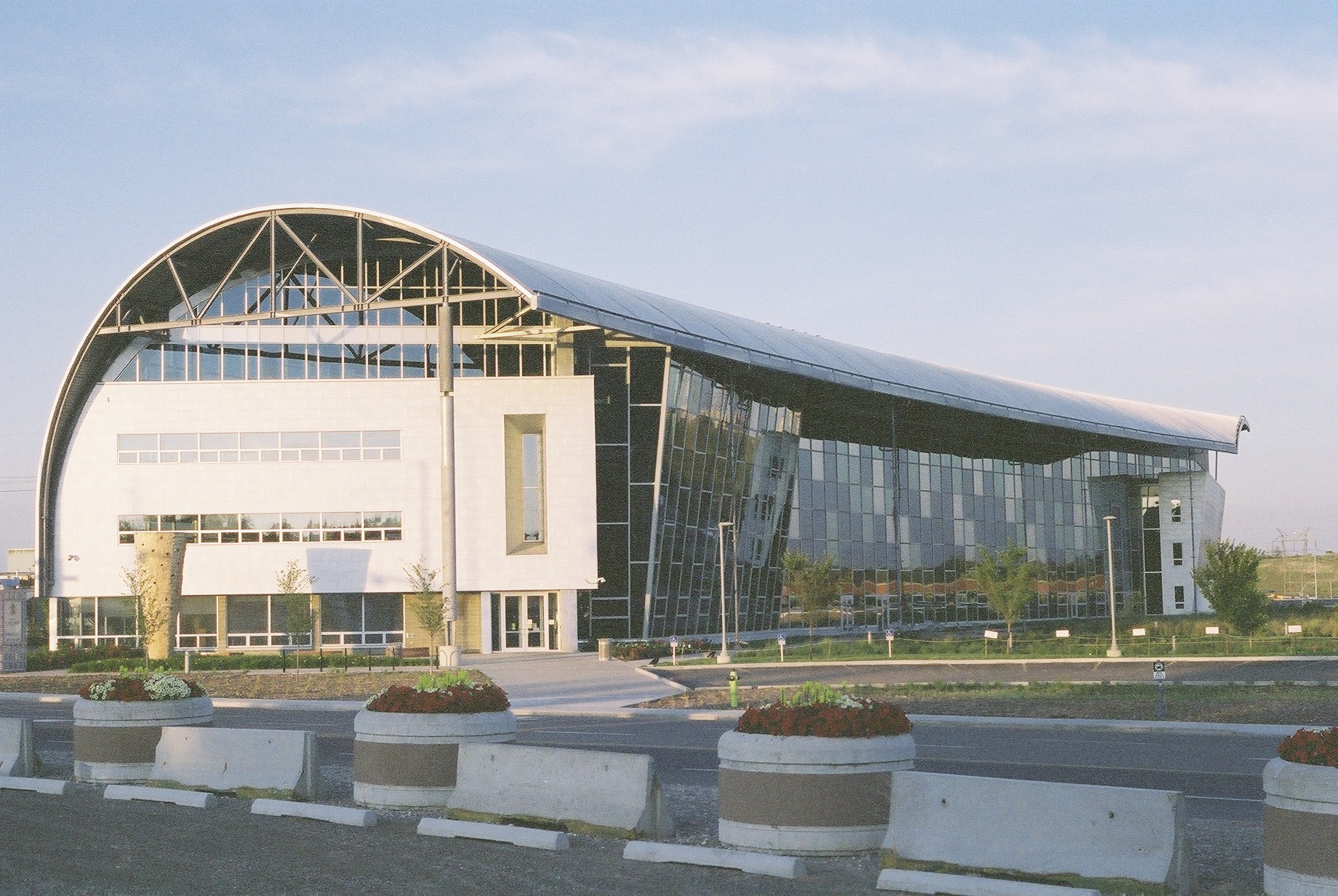
City of Calgary Water Centre

== Career ==
Manasc is principal in the firm Reimagine Architects, formerly Manasc Isaac Architects. c. Projects by her firm include the City of Calgary Water Centre, and the Mosaic Centre for Conscious Community and Commerce, a net-zero commercial building in Edmonton, Alberta.

From 2017 to 2021, Manasc was the chair of the Board of Governors Athabasca University.

She was awarded the Alberta Order of Excellence in 2017.
