= Canadian Green Building Awards =

The Canadian Green Building Awards are a joint program between the Canada Green Building Council and Sustainable Architecture & Building Magazine (SAB Mag). The Canadian Green Building Awards are awarded annually to both residential and non-residential projects across Canada of excellent and innovative design and execution. Eligible projects range from new construction, existing buildings, interior design projects, and renovations and retrofits. Entry submission kits are available in January of every year, and the judging occurs in March. Winning projects are announced in May, and publicized in the summer issue of SAB Mag, on the SAB Mag and the Ca GBC website, and at the Ca GBC National Conference.

== Jury ==
The Canadian Green Building Awards typically has a jury of 4 people who work in the architecture industry, specializing in sustainability and energy efficiency. These jury members change annually.

== Notable Projects ==
The Canadian Green Building Awards chooses notable projects of all different uses from all around Canada.

== 2015 Winners ==
Name of Project	Location	Jury Comments	Project Credits
Surrey Civic Centre	Surrey, BC	"A bold and dramatic building that is nonetheless refined and elegant. A fitting statement for a municipality that is forging a new identity based on the consideration of sustainability at all levels - including transit, civicand community space, and the transparency and accessibility of government. This is a building that will draw the community in. Its performance metrics are equally impressive."	Owner/Developer: Surrey City Development Corporation Architect: Moriyama & Teshima Architects, Joint Venture Architect Kasian Project Manager: Pivotal General Contractor: PCL Structural Engineer: Read Jones Christoffersen Consulting Engineers Mechanical/Electrical Engineer: MCW Consultants Ltd. Landscape Architects: Moriyama & Teshima Planners Civil Engineer: Aplin & Martin Consultant Ltd. LEED & Building Envelope Consultant: Morrison Hershfield Cost Consultant: Gage Babcock & Associates Ltd. Photos: Emma Peter
Halifax Central Library	Halifax, NS	"An extraordinary building that is most successful in its drama of architectural form and its public space. The project balances its architectural, social and environmental aspirations and provides a great model for the design of environmentally responsible community buildings. The Halifax Central Library provides an exciting and enjoyable community hub for Downtown Halifax, where building users will also be introduced first hand to key elements of sustainable design."	Owner/Developer: Halifax Regional Municipality Architect: Fowler Bauld & Mitchell Ltd. with Schmidt Hammer Lassen Architects Construction Manager: Ellis Don Landscape Architect: Gordon Ratcliffe Civil/structural Engineer: SNC Lavalin Mechanical/Electrical Engineer: CBCL Limited Commissioning Agent: F.C O'Neill Scriven & Associates Ltd. Photos: Adam Mork
MEC Head Office	Vancouver, BC	"A very high-performance building that does justice to its client's corporate philosophy and aspirations. It includes some wonderful collaborative and social spaces. The project has been tailored to its inhabitants, offering up environmental features as a way to enhance their day-to-day working life. The green roof is not there just to gain a credit, but is a habitable program space for the enjoyment of employees."	Owner/Developer: MEC Architect: Proscenium Architecture + Interiors Inc. Structural Engineer: Fast + Epp Structural Engineers General Contractor: Ventana Construction Landscape Architect: Sharp + Diamond Landscape Architecture Civil Engineer: KWL Associates Ltd. Electrical/mechanical Engineer: Pageau Morel et Associés Commissioning Agent: Stantec Photos: Ed White Photography
Kwayatsut	Vancouver, BC	"A challenging project, serving a high needs user group, this building needed to be highly durable as well as welcoming, supportive and environmentally responsible. To have met all these requirements on a tight budget is a considerable achievement. The building is generous and inclusive with elegant, comfortable and welcoming spaces that support and enhance self esteem. Transparency at grade enhances the connection to the community"	Owner/Developer: Vancouver Native Housing Society Architect: NSDA Architects General Contractor: Darwin Construction Ltd. Landscape Architect: Perry + Associates ElectricaL / Mechanical Engineer: MMM Group Structural Engineer: Fast + Epp Structural Engineers Commissioning Agent: CES Engineering Building Envelope: exp. Services Inc. Photos: Derek Lepper Photography
Sechelt Hospital Expansion and Renovations	Sechelt, BC	"This project is exemplary for its depth of integration at the community and social level. It is also an interesting exploration of how to improve clinical environments with operable windows, natural light and the integration of culture and community through works of art. Achieving such a high level of performance and at the same time strong connections to culture, nature and community is remarkable - particularly in a P3 project."	Owner/Developer: Vancouver Coastal Health Architect: Farrow Partnership in association with Perkins+Will Canada Structural Engineer: Fast + Epp Structural Engineers Electrical Engineer: Acumen Engineering Mechanical Engineer: Integral Group Landscape Architect: Sharp & Diamond Landscape Architecture Inc. Civil Engineer: Stantec General Contractor: Graham Construction and Engineering Commissioning Agent: CES Group Photos: Latreille & Delage
Earth Sciences Building	Vancouver, BC	"A highly energy-efficient building that is also exemplary in its use of new wood products and technology. The facades are nuanced in their response to solar orientation and views, and the interiors are warm, welcoming and beautifully lit. The project expresses its intentions very clearly in the arrangement of its program, the transparency of its activities and the high level of refinement in its detailing."	Owner/Developer: UBC Properties Trust Architect: Perkins + Will Canada Construction Manager: Bird Construction Landscape Architect: Eckford Tyacke + Associates Civil Engineer: Core Group Consultants Electrical Engineer: Acumen Engineering Mechanical Engineer: Stantec Consulting Structural Engineer: Equilibrium Consulting Inc. Photos: Martin Tessler
George Brown College Waterfront Campus	Toronto, ON	"This highly accomplished and elegant building is notable for its strong relationship to site, its accessibility to the public and its 'porous' program of social space. The space flows freely between outside and inside, then through the building in a consistent and understated way. The high level of environmental performance is also achieved without overt expression of sustainable systems. A rare example of an institutional building that is also welcoming to the public and exciting to explore."	Client: George Brown College Architects: Stantec Architecture and Kuwabara Payne McKenna Blumberg Architects, Architects in Joint Venture Engineers [structural, mechanical, electrical, civil and sustainability, energy]: Stantec Consulting Inc. Cost consultant: Hanscomb Building Code: Leber | Rubes Landscape: Phillips Farevaag Smallenberg Landscape Architects Geostructural Engineer: Sherwood Geostructural Engineers Marine Engineer: SHAL Consulting Engineers Geotechnical and Environmental Engineer: Trow Associates Project Manager: Terry Comeau, Nerys Rau Construction Manager: EllisDon Photos: Tom Arban Photography and Richard Johnson
Beechwood Deep Energy Retrofit	Toronto, ON	"A highly transferable example of how to intensify existing communities, adding to their capacity and improving their energy performance. The ambition to take this rather unremarkable existing house to an exceptionally high level of energy performance is to be applauded, as is the suite of innovative but highly transferable strategies that were used. It is also noteworthy that the project team decided to build upward rather than outward, and to restore previously paved areas of the site to natural landscape."	General Contractor: Greening Homes Ltd. Architect: Open Architects Mechanical Engineer: Sustainable EDGE

== 2016 Winners ==
Name of Project	Location	Jury Comments	Project Credits
Dura House	Terence Bay, NS	"An exemplary project that responds to the opportunities of its site, while respecting the rigours of the North Atlantic coastal climate. A compact plan, strategically placed thermal mass, airtightness 50% better than Passive House standard and a highly insulated building envelope make this a truly low energy house. Add to this the live/work configuration that will reduce transportation energy and the result is a compelling prototype which combines energy conservation, clever programming and contextual sensitivity."	Owner/Developer: David Coole Architect: DR Coole Architecture Inc. General Contractor: David Coole Structural Engineer: Griggs Engineering Mechanical Engineer: Equilibrium Engineering Photos: Elemental Photography
Fort St. John Passive House	Fort St. John, BC	"A highly commendable effort by a small and remote municipality to create a prototype residential building to the highest energy performance standards. One of the few single-family houses to be certified to Passive House standards anywhere in Canada, the educational opportunity this project represents is profound - and all the more remarkable because it is located in an area where the economy is dominated by the oil and gas industry."	Architect: Marken Projects Owner/Developer: City of Fort St. John General Contractor: City of Fort St. John Landscape Architect: City of Fort St. John Mechanical Engineer: Renu Building Science Structural Engineer: Equilibrium Consulting Inc. [Structure], Jim Jarvis Engineering [Foundation] Commissioning Agent: D. Bauer Mechanical Photos: Velvet Leaf Photography
Grange Triple Double	Toronto, ON	"A flexible, multi-unit, multi-generational home that provides proof of concept for a new approach to urban intensification. The strategic approach to site planning, building massing, and programmatic flexibility simultaneously addresses the quantitative requirement for increased density, and the qualitative requirement to maintain the physical, social and cultural continuity of the neighbourhood. Passive and Active Design strategies combine to achieve a high standard of building performance."	Owner/Developer: Name withheld Architect: Williamson Chong Structural Engineer: Blackwell Construction Manager: Derek Nicholson Inc. Millwork: BL Woodworking Windows: Torp Inc. Drawings and Diagrams: Williamson Chong Photos: Bob Gundu
Our House	Toronto, ON	"A simple, strategic and highly reproducible series of interventions have completely transformed this modest residence into an appealing family home. Working within the constraints of a 450ft2 footprint, this project is notable for its compelling, well-proportioned spaces conjured out of an existing structure that was virtually unliveable. With close attention paid to airtightness, insulation levels and high-performance triple-glazed windows and skylights, energy performance has been improved by 90%."	Architect: Solares Architecture Inc. General Contractor: Tomislav Knezic Interior Finishing Contractor: Paul Drummond Landscape Architect: R Environs Inc. Mechanical Engineer: SGA Associates Inc. Structural Engineer: Katakkar Engineering associates Commissioning Agent: Blue Green Consulting Group Photos: Derek Monson
Jasper Place Library	Edmonton, AB	"The bold sculptural form makes this library an enchanting focal point in an otherwise visually unremarkable suburban community. The transparent facade and overhanging roof are part of a passive design strategy, while at the same time blurring the distinction between the interior and exterior of the building. The clear span concrete roof facilitates future reconfiguration of the program, while its undulating form serves to articulate interior spaces of differing character. Overall an engaging project that makes a vital contribution to the quality of community life."	Owner/Developer: Edmonton Public Library Architect: HCMA Architecture + Design in joint venture with DUB Architects Structural Engineer: Fast + Epp Mechanical Engineer: Williams Engineering Canada Inc. Electrical Engineer: Williams Engineering Canada Inc. Civil Engineer: ISL Engineering and Land Services Inc. Landscape Architect: Carlisle + Associates [now DIALOG] General Contractor: Stuart Olson Dominion Construction Commissioning Agent: Hemisphere Engineering Photos: Hubert Kang Photography
Groupe Dynamite Atrium	Montreal, QC	"Injecting life into a dead space between two large floor plate industrial buildings, this project achieves the greatest possible benefit to the company's employees with the minimum possible intervention. Despite the lack of an overt energy strategy, the atrium addresses issues of community, light and air, wellness, material efficiency and building life cycle - all of which are key aspects of sustainability."	Architect: Aedifica Owner/Developer: Ciro M. Falluh General Contractor: Reliance Construction Group Mechanical Engineer: Aedifica Consultants Electrical Engineer: Aedifica Consultants Structural Engineer: SBSA Experts-Conseils Photos: Francois Descôteaux
Budzey Building	Vancouver, BC	"This public sector project is a model for energy-efficient high-rise residential design. The 30% window-to-wall ratio, the high-performance envelope with thermal breaks, radiant in-slab heating and heat recovery ventilation in each suite are strategies all private sector developers should try to emulate. This project is characterized by a remarkable quality and generosity of the interior spaces, making it an example of architecture that could truly transform the lives of its embattled residents."	Architect: NSDA Architects Owner/Developer: Budzey Building Funding Authority: BC Housing Housing Consultant: Terra Housing Consultants Ltd. Structural Engineer: Fast + Epp Structural Engineers Landscape Architect: Perry + Associates Electrical Engineer: MMM Group Mechanical Engineer: MMM Group Geotechnical Consultant: Horizon Engineering Building Code: LMDG Building Code Consultants Commissioning Agent: Inland Technical Services Ltd. Sustainability: Recollective Building Envelope: exp. Services Inc. General Contractor: Stuart Olson Construction Ltd. Photos: Derek Lepper Photography
Bill Fisch Forest Stewardship and Education Centre	Whitchurch-Stouffville, ON	"The first Living Building Challenge contender in Ontario, this benchmark project goes beyond net zero energy by meticulously pursuing a range of familiar conservation strategies including: a high-performance envelope with R-40 walls and R-60 roof; a window-to-wall ratio of less than 30%; and triple-glazed windows oriented for optimal solar orientation. A 35kW photovoltaic array contributes to the net positive energy result. Other notable achievements include net zero water, with rain and well water meeting 100% of occupant needs."	Owner/Developer: The Regional Municipality of York Architect: DIALOG Ontario Inc. [DIALOG] Structural Engineer: DIALOG Mechanical Engineer: DIALOG Electrical Engineer: DIALOG Building Envelope: Dr. Ted Kesik Civil Engineer: Struct-Con Construction Ltd. Landscape Architect: DIALOG General Contractor: Struct-Con Construction Ltd. Commissioning Agent: MMM Group LTd. Photos: Tom Arban
