= Homebuilders Association Vancouver =

Canadian not-for-profit organization

Homebuilders Association Vancouver (HAVAN) is a Canadian not-for-profit trade association representing businesses and professionals in the residential construction industry in Metro Vancouver, British Columbia. The association was established in 1974 as the Greater Vancouver Home Builders' Association (GVHBA) and adopted its current name in 2019. The Association is affiliated with the Canadian Home Builders' Association (CHBA) at both the provincial and national levels.

== History ==
The association was established in 1974 as the Greater Vancouver Home Builders' Association. It represented members of the residential construction industry in Greater Vancouver and addressed issues related to housing development, building regulations and housing supply.

HAVAN is a membership-based organization with committees covering government relations, education, technical matters, marketing, design, renovation and custom homebuilding. It reports a membership of more than 1,100 companies and individuals in the Metro Vancouver residential construction industry.

In January 2019, the association changed its name to Homebuilders Association Vancouver (HAVAN). In 2024, the association marked its 50th anniversary.

== Activities ==
In 2016, its chief executive, Bob de Wit, said that the provincial foreign-buyer tax could lead to job losses in the construction sector. The association also raised concerns about the effect of tariffs on imported drywall on construction costs. In 2024, HAVAN published research on development charges and housing costs in Metro Vancouver. The association reported that more than 73,000 approved homes had not been built and linked the delay partly to development charges and other costs. In 2026, HAVAN launched the Build Homes, Not Barriers campaign, which called for changes to municipal policies affecting housing development and construction costs in British Columbia.
