= Harold Shipp =

Canadian businessman (1926–2014)

Harold G. Shipp
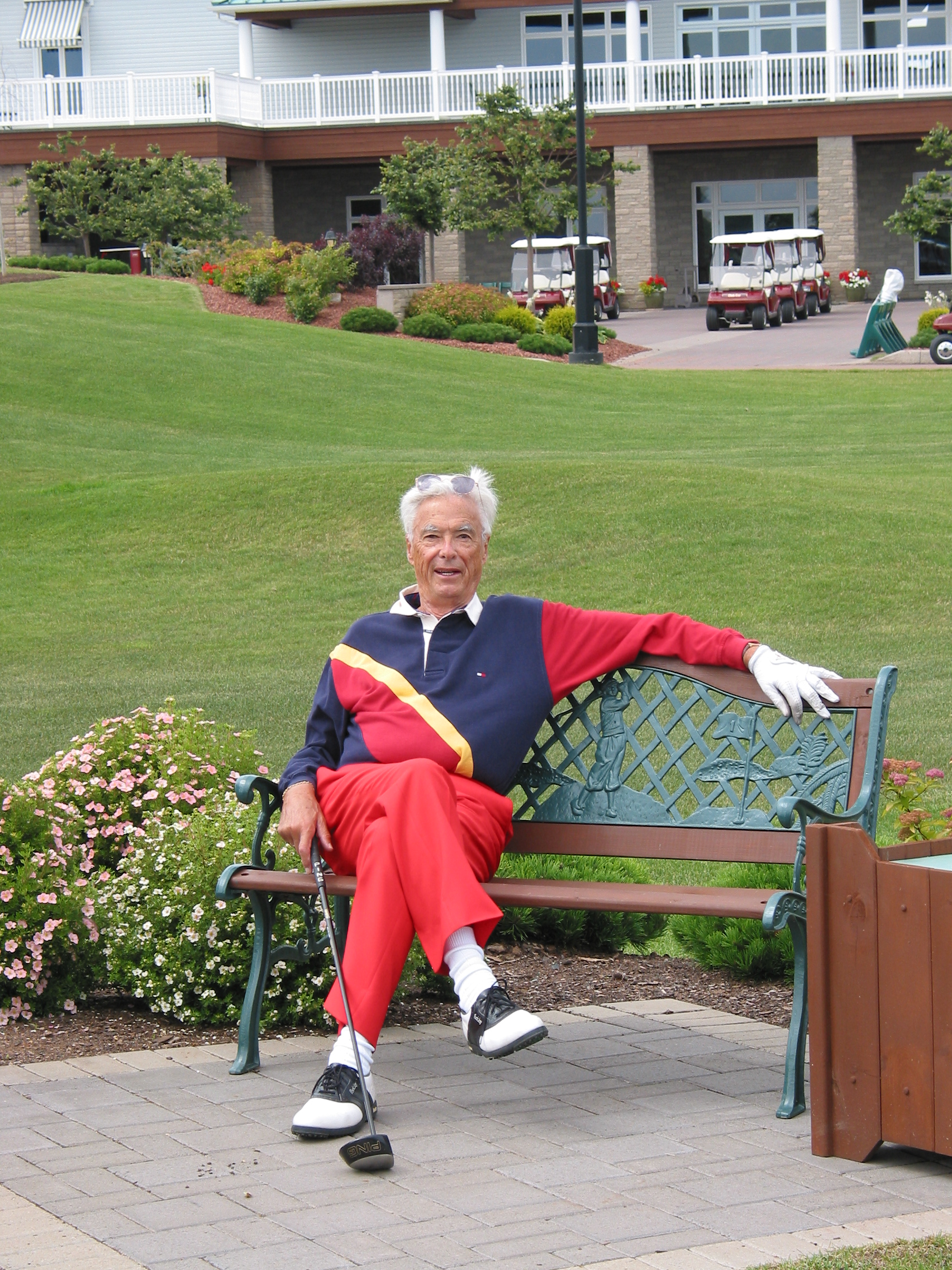
- Born: January 21, 1926; East York, Ontario
- Died: September 7, 2014 (aged 88); Mississauga, Ontario
- Occupations: Chairman of Shipp Corporation Limited (formerly Chairman and CEO), Chairman of the Shipp Corporation Inc. of Fort Lauderdale, Florida (formerly Chairman and CEO)
- Spouse(s): June Catharine Ingram (deceased, October 4, 2001); Margaret Dabrowska (married, December 22, 2011 - September 7, 2014)
- Children: Victoria Haviland, Catharine Marjorie, Gordon Harold
- Parent(s): Gordon Stanley Shipp, Bessie Luella Breeze

Harold Gordon Shipp (January 21, 1926 – September 7, 2014) was a Canadian businessman, philanthropist and the chairman of Shipp Corporation Limited.

== Early life ==
Shipp was born on January 21, 1926, in East York, Ontario to Gordon S. Shipp and Bessie Luella Breeze. His father was a speculative and custom home builder, founding his firm in 1923 when he moved from western Ontario, where he was an Ontario farmer. Shipp completed his high school education at Etobicoke High School (now Etobicoke Collegiate Institute) in 1945, with which he maintained very close association. In the spring of 1946, Shipp was asked to join his father in a new enterprise, then called G.S. Shipp and Son. Shipp and his wife, June Catharine Ingram (d. October 4, 2001) married on September 30, 1949.

== Career ==
Shipp first entered the family construction business in 1945 at the age of 19, immediately upon graduation from high school. He became a full partner in his father’s business on April 1, 1946, and one year later GS Shipp and Son was incorporated.

Responsible for the planning and development of the Applewood Acres sub-division, GS Shipp and Son built and paid for the original Applewood Public School in 1955 (originally an elementary school, and converted to a school for secondary school-aged students with developmental disabilities and its name changed to Applewood Acres School in January 1982). GS Shipp and Son also built some 300 homes in Credit Woodlands (1955) and developed some 400 homes in Riverview Gardens in Streetsville. He also built approximately 200 homes in Sault Ste. Marie Ontario in the 1960s which are still sought after today.

In 1959, Shipp along with two partners established Applewood Motors and a Streetsville Chevrolet Oldsmobile car dealership, later known as Applewood Chevrolet Cadillac Buick GMC, a member of the Humberview Group. As part of a marketing effort, Shipp decided to put three cars on the roof of Shipp model homes to increase publicity. This news travelled worldwide and received extensive media coverage in Japan.

In the fall of 1957, Thomas Laird Kennedy, who briefly served as Premier of Ontario, asked Harold Shipp to succeed him as his choice as the Conservative candidate for the region of Peel. Kennedy visited Mr. Shipp at his office where he informed him of his decision not to stand in the 1959 provincial election. After a few weeks of consideration, Shipp declined the offer citing family issues.

In 1960, Harold Shipp became President of the Toronto Homebuilders Association, a position his father held from 1954 to 1956. It is still the only time that a father and son both held this position.

In 1967, the Shipps formed a joint venture with Mutual Life of Canada to produce four high-rise apartment buildings, the latter one winning the Canadian housing design award in 1974.

In 1974 Shipp was named to the Board of Counsellors of Oxford College of Emory University.

In 1978, Shipp's company entered into high-rise commercial development with the commencement of an office park known as the Mississauga Executive Centre, which was to comprise four office towers. The Shipp Centre, a commercial office complex at the intersection of Islington Avenue and Bloor St., West in Etobicoke, was completed in 1981. Adjacent to the Shipp Centre is Kingsway on-the-Park, a 289 suite condominium residence in two towers of 24 and 25 stories, respectively. The buildings are connected to phase three of the Shipp Centre (now called Bloor Islington Place), which allows access to the Toronto subway system.

Shipp acted as the Chairman of the Royal Visit to Mississauga for the official opening of City Hall in 1987. The arrival of the Duke and Duchess of York was a grand affair with members of Council and dignitaries assembled in the courtyard to greet them. This was the first major event to be held in the Great Hall.

According to author Roger E. Riendeau, Shipp Corporation is one of the few businesses that can truly make the claim that they built Mississauga. Shipp and his family have lived in Mississauga since 1953 and the Shipp Corporation Limited is the longest continuing builder and developer in Mississauga having operated there since 1951.

On April 28, 2005, the Trillium Health Centre announced a $6 million pledge from Harold Shipp.

== Death ==
Shipp died after a short illness at the Trillium Hospital on September 7, 2014.

== Awards and recognition ==
- 2012 First Recipient of the Civic Award of Philanthropy in Mississauga, presented by Mayor Hazel McCallion
- 2009 Mississauga Board Of Trade Inaugural, "Lifetime Business Achievement Award"
- 2003 Lifetime Achievement Award Presented by National Association Of Industrial And Office Parks (NAIOP)
- 1992 Commemorative Medals for 125th Anniversary of Canadian Confederation
- 1992 City of Etobicoke 1991 Personal & Corporate Service Award
- 1990 Guest of Honor; Mississauga’s Community Living for Community Service
- 1988 Gordon S Shipp Memorial Award, Mississauga "Citizen of the Year"
- 1986 Elected to Canadian Home Builders Hall of Fame
- 1986 Mississauga Business Person of the year (Charter Year)
- 1984 Paul Harris Award for Community Service, Rotary club
- Queen's Silver Jubilee Medal
- Chairman of Citizen's Committee for opening of new Mississauga Civic Centre in July 1989
