= City of Calgary Water Centre =

Coordinates: 51.02924°N 114.04849°W

Calgary Water Centre
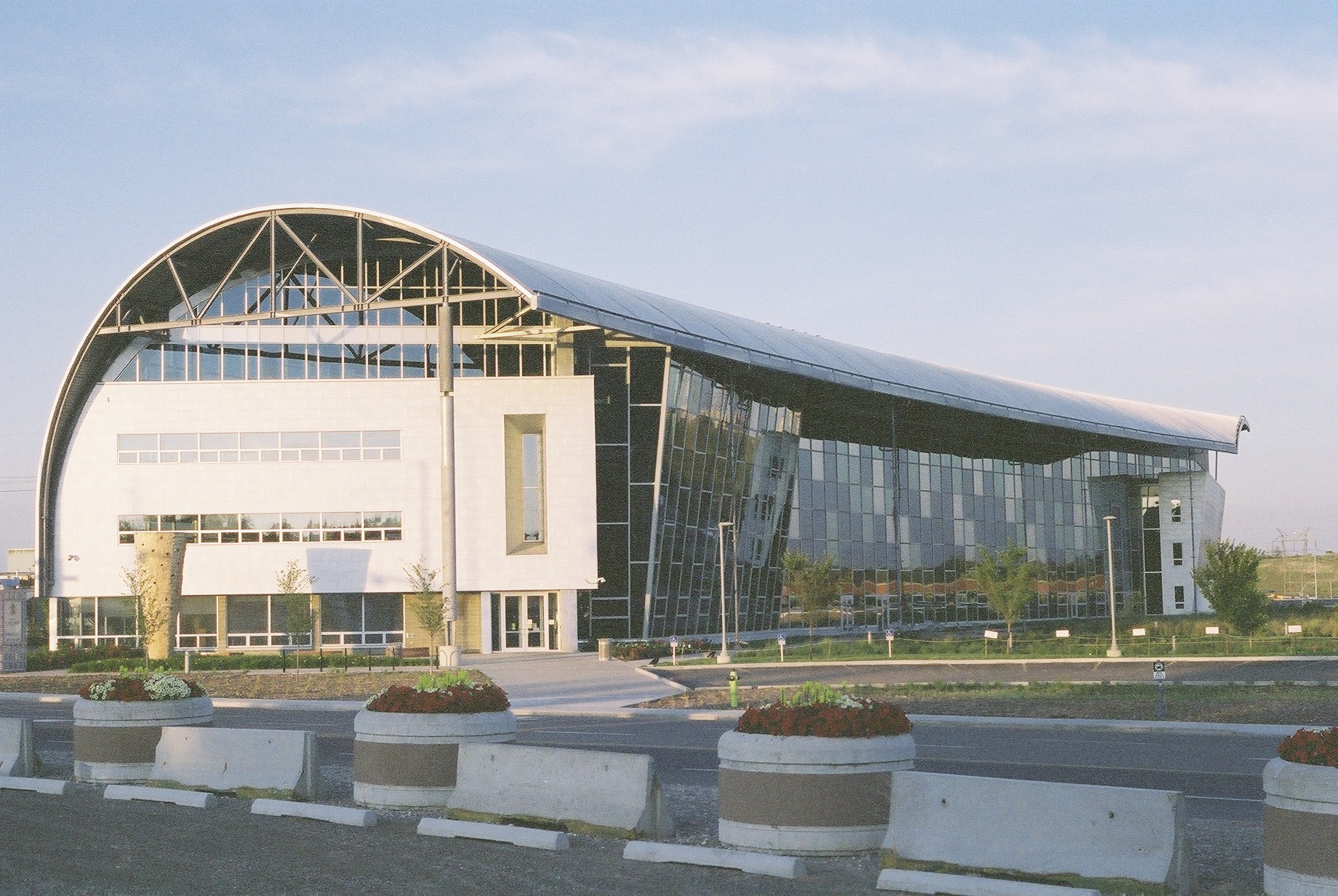
- Interactive map of the Calgary Water Centre area

General information
- Type: Office building
- Location: Calgary, Alberta
- Completed: June 4, 2008
- Cost: CA$43,000,000
- Owner: City of Calgary

Dimensions
- Diameter: 160 m (520 ft)

Technical details
- Floor count: 4
- Floor area: 183,000 sq ft (17,000 m^{2})

Design and construction
- Architecture firm: Manasc Isaac; Sturgess Architecture
- Main contractor: Dominion Construction

The City of Calgary Water Centre is the headquarters of Calgary's Water Resources and Water Services' staff, housing its 460 professional and 314 field staff. The four-storey office building was completed in 2008, and upon opening was both the largest LEED-rated office building in Alberta and Alberta's first Gold-certified building. The building was designed through a collaboration between Sturgess Architecture and Manasc Isaac.

== Construction ==
The project began in 2005, and was expected to cost CA$33,000,000. It was built on a brownfield site owned by the city near the Calgary Stampede grounds, previously occupied by a furrier and a C-Train depot.

== Environmental status ==
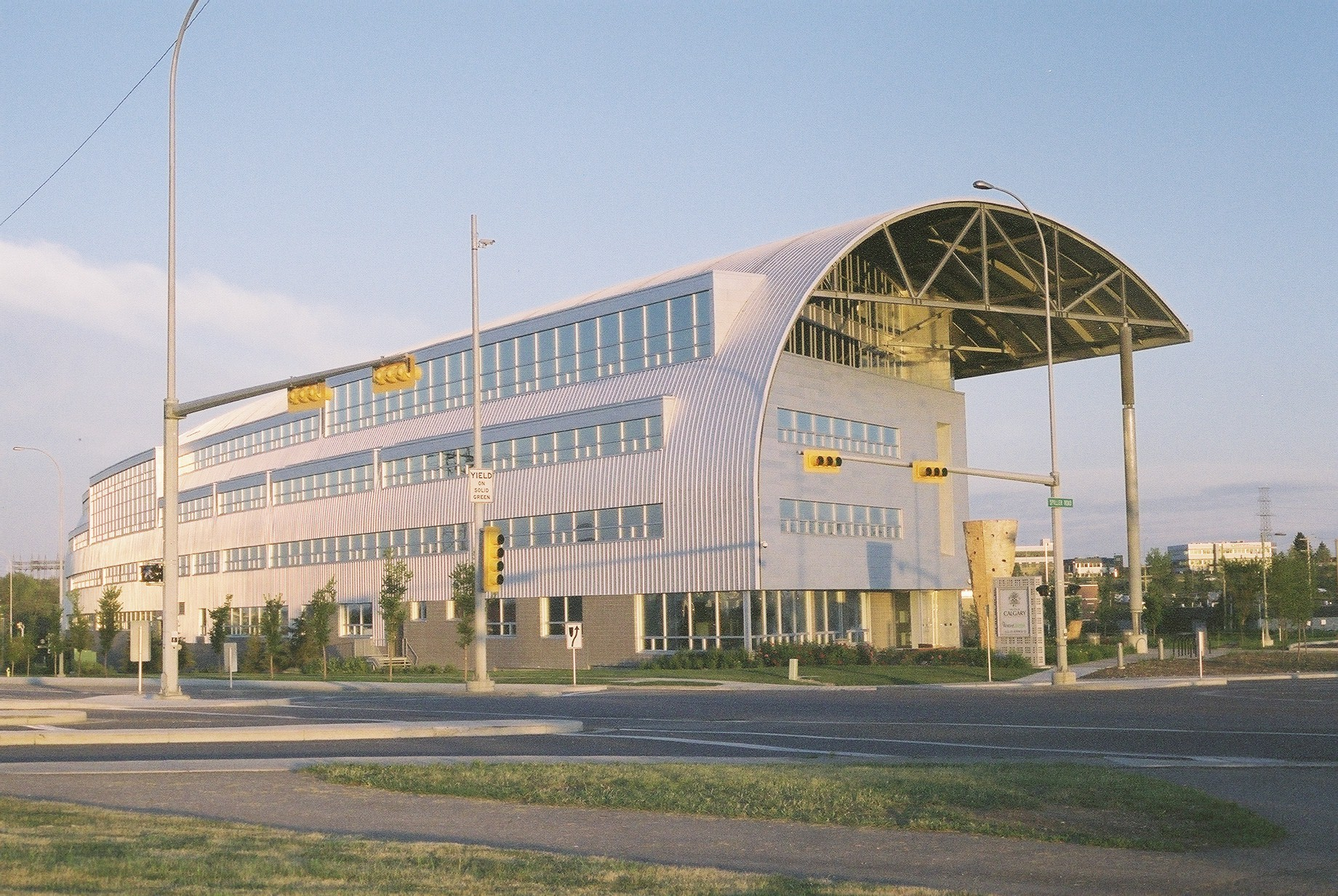
Rear view of the Water Centre

The Calgary Water Centre is the first building in Alberta to be certified Gold by the Leadership in Energy and Environmental Design (LEED) rating system, and is one of the first to be built under the City of Calgary's 2003 requirement for all new buildings to meet or exceed LEED's Silver rating. The building incorporates many sustainable design elements such as water conservation (including a green roof, rainwater harvesting, and zero-irrigation landscaping), natural lighting, and an innovative HVAC system.

The building itself is 95% day lit, reduces waste water by 72%, reduces overall water usage by 59%, and achieves a 58% savings in annual energy consumption. Additionally, the building's efficient use of materials resulted in a 95% recycling rate of excess construction material. The building's energy savings are expected to offset its $43m construction cost in 15 years, and it is to operate for an additional 35 years with minimal maintenance costs.

== See also ==
- Greenstone Building, first LEED Gold building in Northern Canada, designed by one of the architecture firms associated with the Water Centre.
