= Mosaic Centre For Conscious Community and Commerce =

Building in Alberta, Canada

General information
- Status: Completed 2015
- Type: Commercial
- Location: 2003 91 Street Southwest, Summerside, Edmonton, Alberta, Canada

Technical details
- Floor area: 2,812m² (30,268 sq ft)

Design and construction
- Architect: Manasc Isaac Architects Ltd.
- Main contractor: Chandos Construction Ltd.

Website
- https://reimagine.ca/work/project/the-mosaic-centre-for-conscious-community-and-commerce

The Mosaic Centre for Conscious Community and Commerce is located in the suburban neighbourhood of Summerside in Edmonton, Alberta, Canada. While originally being designed for Oil Country Engineering Services, the building continues to focus on the engagement within local businesses and the interaction of its users. The main concept within the Mosaic was to build a healthy, sustainable building that continues to produce as much energy as it uses. Many different sustainability techniques were used throughout the design of the building, helping its net-zero energy status within a cold, northern climate.

== History ==
The planning process for the Mosaic Centre for Conscious Community and Commerce originated in 2012 from Christy Benoit and Dennis Cuku, the owners of Oil Country Engineering Services. After previously building their own net-zero house, they had many large goals and expectations of what the building for their business required to achieve the greatest amount of success. These goals largely contributed to the sustainability of the building, as they wanted the Mosaic to accomplish a wide range of standards, one of which was to become the northern most commercial building to achieve a net-zero energy status. While Benoit and Cuku were striving to achieve these goals, they had to collaborate with an architecture firm, as they were unsure how it could be done at the commercial scale.

The Mosaic Centre for Conscious Community and Commerce was designed by Manasc Isaac Architects Ltd., with Vedran Skopac as principal architect. This firm is now known as Reimagine, but it continues to focus on the sustainability, health, and happiness within the environment and the different building users. The main contractor of this project was Chandos Construction Ltd.

The construction was completed in 2015, allowing the Mosaic to open for business in February 2015. In August 2017, PriMed Medical Products bought the Mosaic Centre for Conscious Community and Commerce, now operating PriMed, Seeds and Sprouts Daycare, and EcoAmmo the Workshop Eatery.

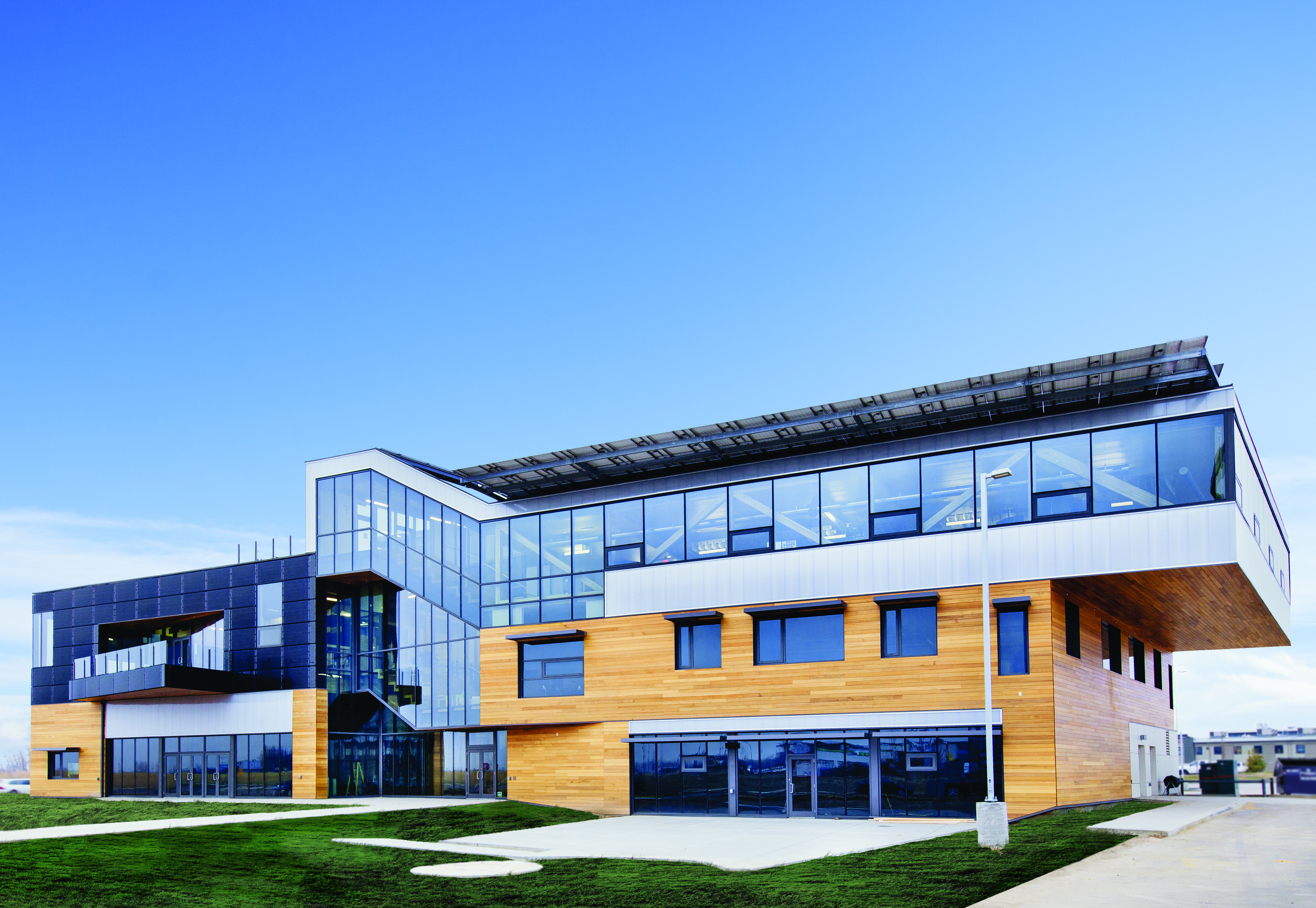
View of south side of Mosaic Centre for Conscious Community and Commerce.

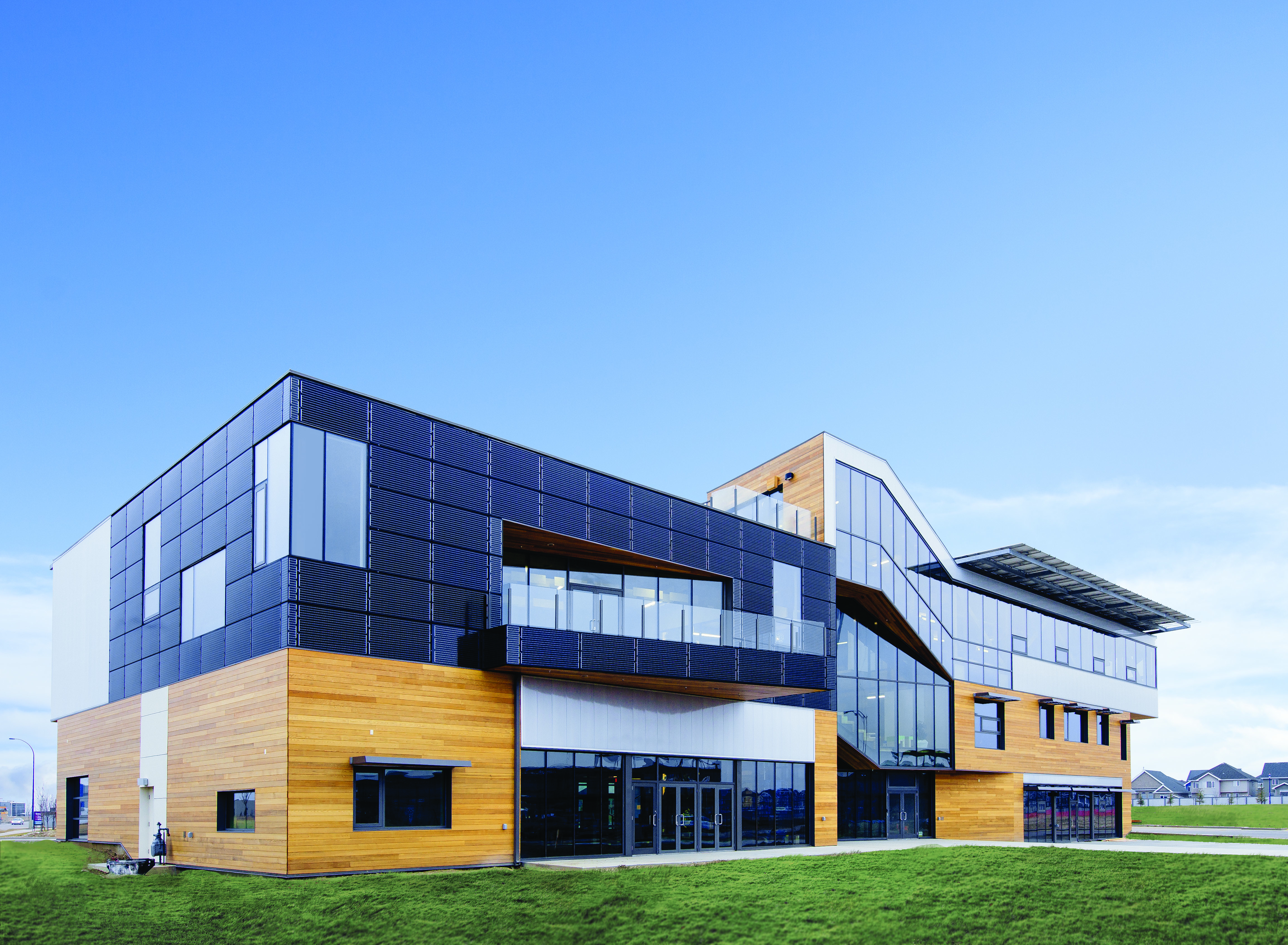
Exterior view of the Mosaic Centre for Conscious Community and Commerce.

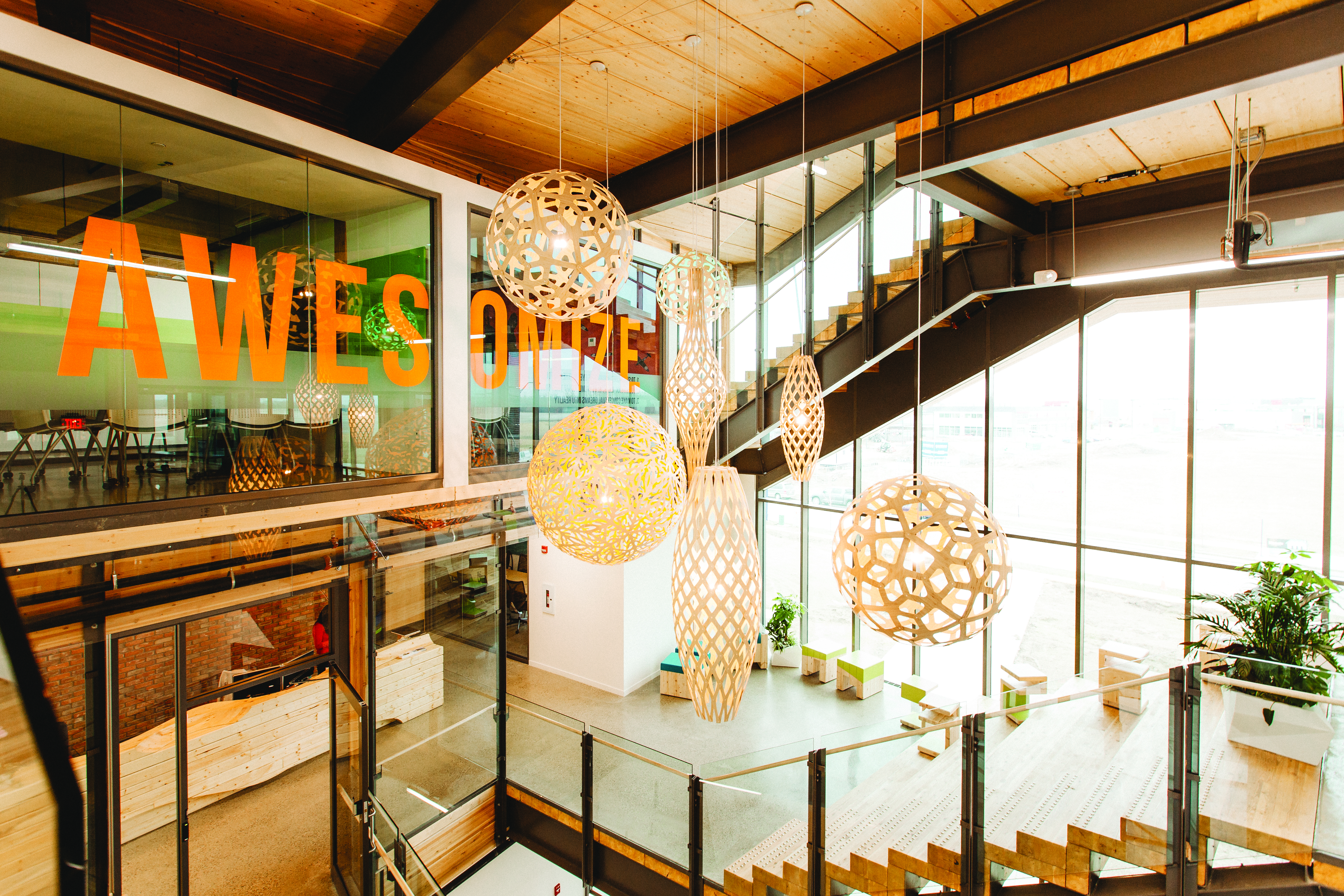
Mosaic Centre for Conscious Community and Commerce central atrium space.

== Design process ==
An Integrated Project Delivery strategy was used throughout the whole planning and construction process of the Mosaic Centre because of the complexity within the concept. This process focuses on collaborations within all members from the beginning stages of the project. The owners, designers, consultants, suppliers, tradesmen, and all other members applied their knowledge and expertise to achieve the outcome of the Mosaic Centre. This strategy resulted in more opportunities and cost reductions since all members were included in every step of the process and worked together to achieve greater success.

Lean methods were also used throughout the design and construction processes of the Mosaic. The Lean decision-making method helped people throughout the project to make decisions because it provided a better understanding for why and how certain systems, design features, and other aspects were used throughout the building. The Lean construction methods enabled the project members to minimize waste and reduce costs. Construction materials were only sent to the site when they were needed, preventing the site from filling up and materials getting in the way of the workers. The Lean methods largely helped with the overall planning process and ensured the owners value was being maximized.

Together, the Integrated Project Delivery process and Lean methods allowed the Mosaic Centre for Conscious Community and Commerce project to be completed 30% ahead of schedule and 5% under budget.

== Interior ==
The Mosaic Centre for Conscious Community and Commerce has a total area of 2,812m^{2} (30,268 sq. ft.). Different parts of the building contain either 2 or 3 storeys. The three different levels represent the shared, public, and private spaces that are seen throughout the Mosaic. Within these spaces there is a wide range in the programming including a wellness centre, childcare centre, restaurant, and offices.

The entire Mosaic Centre was designed to encourage and create interactions between its users. The split-level stairs throughout the building have many platforms, continuously creating visual interactions and leading people throughout the different floors. A central atrium is a large feature throughout the design, with many other features evolving around it. The atrium space consists of bleacher-style seating, with three storey tall ceilings and plenty of natural light. In this space, a living wall designed by Green over Grey, extends to the ceiling and helps purifying the air naturally. Additionally, each program looks onto and is connected to the atrium space, reflecting the feeling of a community within an inviting environment, while also creating many interactions as people utilize the space.

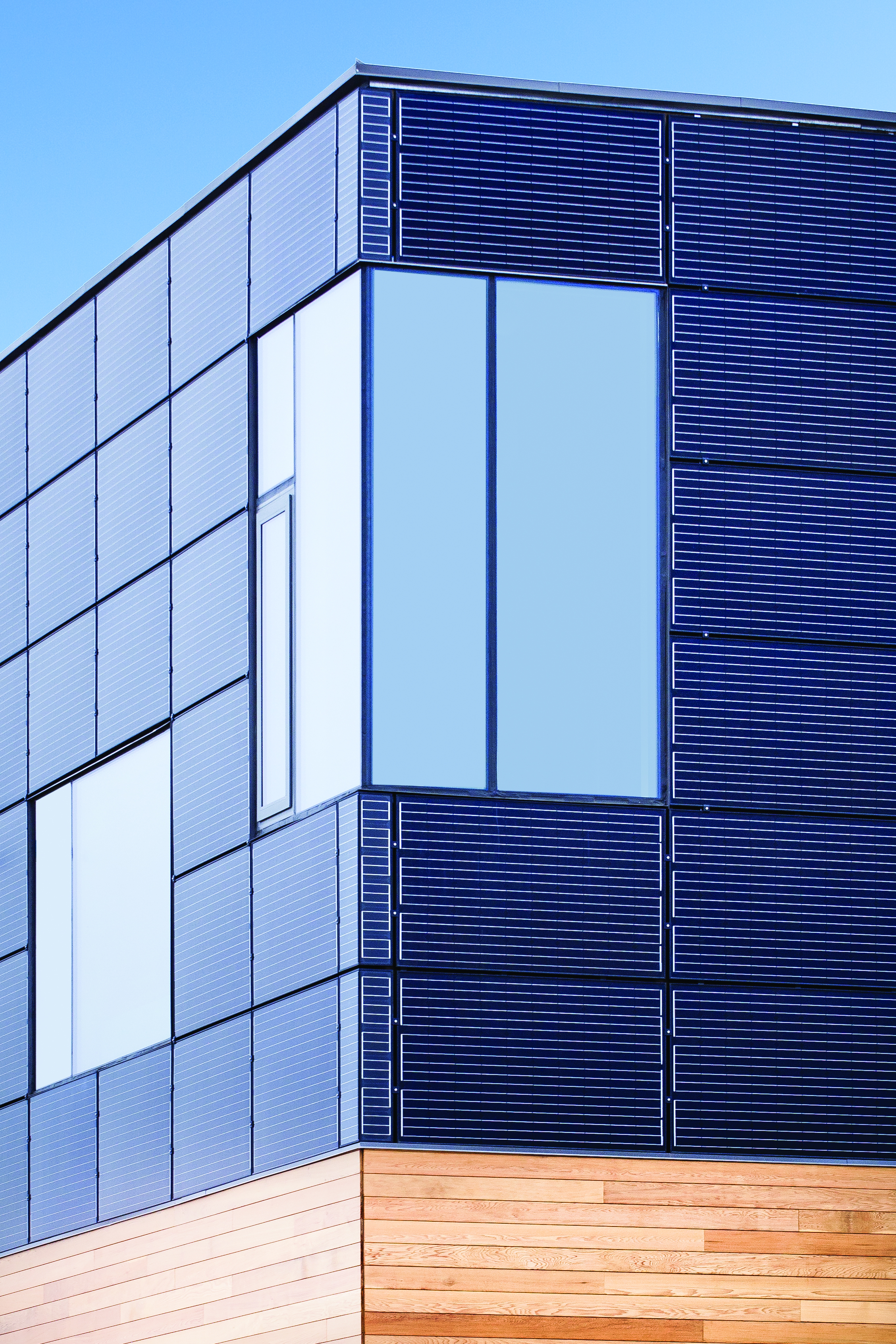
Custom solar panels on the exterior of the Mosaic Centre for Conscious Community and Commerce.

It was important for the company to achieve a net-zero commercial building because of the positive impact it would have on the employees and people using the building. A healthy internal environment significantly contributes to the employee's health, allowing them to be more productive and efficient, which in return will benefit the whole company over time. Throughout the Mosaic, exposed wood is used for the interior cladding. This decision was made to improve air quality, comfort, and overall experience for the users of the building. The wood reduced construction costs because no further cladding materials were needed, while the left-over wood scraps were recycled to create art and furniture.

== Sustainability ==
The Mosaic Centre for Conscious Community and Commerce became the northern most commercial building to achieve a net-zero energy status, the first building in Alberta to be Petal certified by the Living Building Challenge, and the first building in Edmonton to earn LEED Platinum. This net-zero building has also won many other sustainability awards over time because of its achievements and success in a northern climate.

For the Mosaic Centre for Conscious Community and Commerce to become a net-zero commercial building, many design factors on the exterior of the building were considered that affect the consumption and creation of energy, as well as minimizing the operation and construction costs. The building orientation is slightly angled from the layout of the roads, making it parallel with the cardinal directions and allowing it to maximize solar gain. The floor plan is narrow from north to south, but wide from east to west, allowing more sunlight to enter and spread throughout the whole building. To support the restaurant in the Mosaic Centre, the entire site is sloped to the south-west corner so that the water runoff can drain into and be used in the garden. This garden is 30% edible, therefore providing fruit and vegetables to be used in the restaurant, while honey is produced from the beehives on the roof. Electric car chargers and bike storage areas are located on the site to promote alternate methods of transportation that are also more sustainable.

On the south and east exterior facades, as well as the roof of the Mosaic, there are solar panels that produce lots of energy to be used throughout the building. They are located vertically on the building, capturing the maximum amount of sunlight and preventing accumulation of snow on top of them. While the solar panels reduce electricity costs, they also reduce material costs as they replace a large portion of the exterior cladding. Located under the parking lot of the Mosaic, there is a geothermal system with 35 boreholes that uses the energy from the Earth's crust to create heat for the building. This system also decreased the number of solar panels needed on the building, which largely reduced the construction costs. Together, these two systems allow significantly more energy to be created than the amount that is consumed within the Mosaic.

Throughout the design of the Mosaic, many indoor design elements contribute to the sustainable success of the building. Large areas of glazing and operatable windows provide natural ventilation and prevent the need for air conditioning. They also allow light to enter and travel throughout the main spaces, reducing the amount of electricity used for lighting. A building management system was installed to monitor the air conditions and provide a natural exhaust system throughout the Mosaic Centre. A variable refrigerant flow system uses a small amount of energy to regulate the temperature throughout the building. If certain areas of the Mosaic are overheating, then this system will transfer the heat into different spaces to make the heat evenly distributed. A fibreglass curtain wall system was also installed as it maintains the indoor temperature and maximizes the amount of usable floor space, while the concrete floor stores thermal energy. A LULA elevator system is used within the building as it meets all function requirements while only using about one-third of the energy that a standard elevator would use.

== Awards ==
- LEED Platinum Certified
- 2014 Alberta Construction Magazine, Top Projects: Sustainability
- 2015 Canadian Solar Industries Association Game Changer Awards, Solar PV Project of the Year
- 2015 Canadian Institute of Steel Construction Award, CISC Collaboration Award
- 2017 Emerald Foundation, Emerald Award – Innovation
- 2017 VUE Weekly, Best of Edmonton Awards, Best of Edmonton 2017: Best Sustainable Building
- 2017 Petal Certification, Living Building Challenge
