= R-2000 program =

R-2000 is a Natural Resources Canada (NRCan) program that was developed in partnership with the Canadian Home Builders' Association in 1981, and formalized as a standard in 1982. Notably, the R-2000 standard is a voluntary standard to exceed building code requirements for energy efficiency, indoor air quality, and environmental responsibility.

The R-2000 program is managed by NRCan's Office of Energy Efficiency and comprises:

- R-2000 standard - technical specifications
- quality assurance
- certification
- training and licensing of builders and service providers
- consumer information

In May 2008, the CHBA published an internal discussion paper proposing changes to the R-2000 standard so it would remain at the forefront as the reference model that influences other programs or initiatives.

== See also ==
- Canada Green Building Council
- EnerGuide
- Energy Star for New Homes
