= Canada Green Building Council =

- Abbreviation: CAGBC
- Founded: 2003
- Founders: Thomas Mueller, Kevin Hydes, Joe Van Belleghem, Jon Hobbs, Peter Busby,
- Purpose: Green building, sustainability, energy efficiency
- Headquarters: Canada
- Region served: Canada
- Products: Zero Carbon Building Standards
- Methods: Certification programs, advocacy, research and learning.
- Members: Member of the World Green Building Council
- President and CEO: Thomas Mueller
- Award: Green Building Awards • Zero Carbon Design • Deep Carbon Retrofit • New Construction (Commercial or Institutional) • Inspiring Home Leadership Awards • Green Building Champion • Green Building Visionary • Emerging Green Leader • Government Leadership Student Project Award • The Andy Kesteloo Memorial Project Award
- Website: www.cagbc.org

The Canada Green Building Council (CAGBC) is a Canadian organization created in 2003 to further the expansion of green building in Canada. Prior to the formation of the Council, Canada had participated in the United States Green Building Council (USGBC) through British Columbia's membership in the USGBC's Cascadia Chapter.

CAGBC was founded by its current President and CEO, Thomas Mueller, Kevin Hydes of Introba (previously Integral Group), Joe Van Belleghem, Jon Hobbs (formerly of the Royal Architectural Institute of Canada) and Peter Busby of Perkins+Will Canada. It is a member of the World Green Building Council.

The CAGBC's mission is to lead and accelerate the transformation to high-performing, healthy green buildings, homes and communities throughout Canada. CAGBC promotes its Zero Carbon Building Standards, and through GBCI Canada, promotes the LEED rating system, Investor Confidence Project and Investor Ready Energy Efficiency certification, TRUE zero waste certification, SITES, and the WELL Building Standard.

The CAGBC Awards recognize individuals and organizations who have made outstanding contributions to Canada's green building industry. These awards include the Green Building Awards, the Leadership Awards, and the Andy Kesteloo Memorial Student Project Award. These awards celebrate projects, teams and individuals contributing to the advancement of green building in Canada.

== LEED Canada-NC v1.0 ==
The Canadian version of LEED is very similar to the USGBC NC version. It contains the following categories:

- Sustainable sites (SS)
- Water efficiency (WE)
- Energy and atmosphere (EA)
- Materials & resources (MR)
- Indoor environmental quality (EQ)
- Innovation in design (ID)
- Regional priorities (RP)

LEED Certification in Canada is done solely through CAGBC. Registration under LEED® Canada rating systems is closed; projects needed to submit for certification by October 31, 2022. New projects must register under LEED v4.

== See also ==
- Natural Resources Canada
- Rainwater harvesting in Canada
- West Coast Environmental Law
- Environmental Dispute Resolution Fund
- R-2000 program
- Sustainable architecture
- United Kingdom Green Building Council
- United States Green Building Council
- World Green Building Council
- Canadian Green Building Awards
- Green Building in Canada
