= La Malbaie =

- City
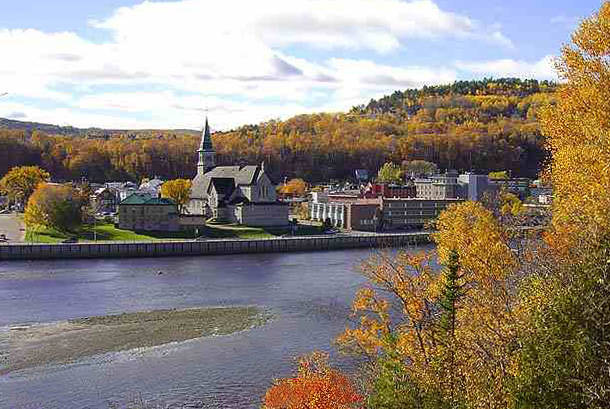
- View of La Malbaie, Quebec

- Coat of arms
- Motto: In Fide Plantati et Radicati
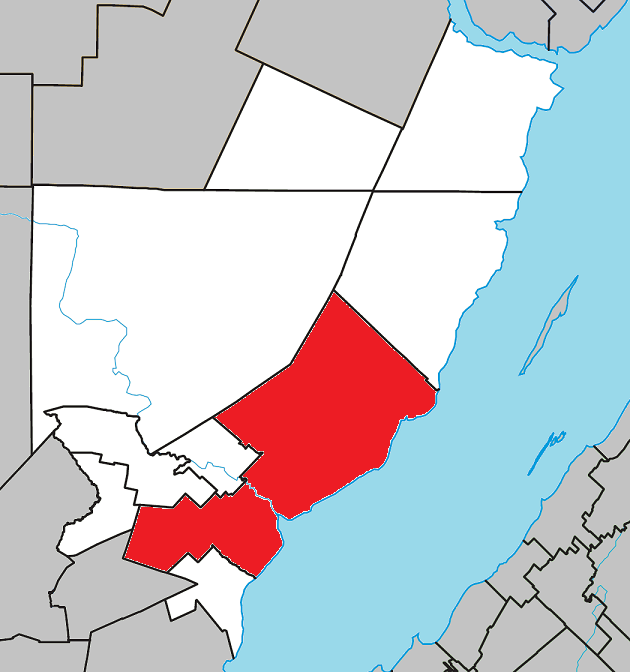
- Location within Charlevoix-Est RCM

- Location in central Quebec
- Coordinates: 47°39′N 70°09′W
- Country: Canada
- Province: Quebec
- Region: Capitale-Nationale
- RCM: Charlevoix-Est
- Constituted: December 1, 1999

Government
  - Mayor: Michel Couturier
  - Federal riding: Montmorency—Charlevoix
  - Prov. riding: Charlevoix–Côte-de-Beaupré

Area
  - Total: 697.32 km^{2} (269.24 sq mi)
  - Land: 458.19 km^{2} (176.91 sq mi)
  - Urban: 3.97 km^{2} (1.53 sq mi)

Population (2021)
  - Total: 8,235
  - Density: 18/km^{2} (47/sq mi)
  - Urban: 3,534
  - Urban density: 890.2/km^{2} (2,306/sq mi)
  - Pop (2016–21): ▼0.4%
  - Dwellings: 4,563
- Time zone: UTC−5 (EST)
  - Summer (DST): UTC−4 (EDT)
- Postal code(s): G5A
- Area codes: 418 and 581
- Highways: R-138; R-362
- Website: www.ville.lamalbaie.qc.ca

La Malbaie (French pronunciation: [la malbɛ]) is a municipality in the Charlevoix-Est Regional County Municipality in the Province of Quebec, Canada, situated on the north shore of the St. Lawrence River at the mouth of the Malbaie River. It was formerly known as Murray Bay. La Malbaie is the seat of the judicial district of Charlevoix.

Although the main business district is located at the mouth of the Malbaie River, the town itself covers a vast area that extends inland along both sides of the Malbaie River and north and south along the St. Lawrence River. The village of Pointe-au-Pic amalgamated with La Malbaie in 1995, and the villages of Rivière-Malbaie, Sainte-Agnès, Cap-à-l'Aigle, and Saint-Fidèle were added in 1999. The neighbouring town of Clermont is located about 7 kilometres (4.3 mi) upstream along the Malbaie River.

== History ==
1605: French explorer Samuel de Champlain fails to find suitable anchorage on his arrival in the area in May and names the bay Malle Baye (old French for “bad bay”).

1688: Rudimentary settlement begins at La Malbaie to export lumber to France, but the focus quickly turns to the fur trade and beluga fishing.

1724: A farm established at La Malbaie begins providing meat and grain to the French king's trading posts along the St. Lawrence River.

1763: Two Scottish officers of the British Army—John Nairne (1731–1802) and Malcolm Fraser (1733–1815)—receive concessions in the area from the British Crown. Nairne's encompasses the tiny settlement of La Malbaie and the western side of the Malbaie River. Fraser's stretches to the east. They also rename the bay, settlement, and river “Murray Bay” after James Murray (1721–1794), a British general and the successor to General James Wolfe. Murray Bay never becomes the official name, but is the internationally accepted toponym in the 18th and 19th centuries even though La Malbaie remains in local use.

1774: The parish of Saint-Étienne-de-la-Malbaie is founded.

1825: The parish is canonically established.

1830: The steamship Waterloo pays a visit to La Malbaie “on a pleasure trip,” the first such recorded commercial visit.

Circa 1840: For the first time, well-to-do visitors begin to summer in La Malbaie.

1853: Construction of a quay on piles at Pointe-au-Pic makes it possible for steamers to begin providing regular service to leisure travellers.

1855: The Parish Municipality of Saint-Étienne-de-Murray-Bay is founded.

1876: The Murray Bay Golf Club opens, the third oldest course in North America and the oldest still operating at the same location.

1892: Future president of the United States William Howard Taft and his family begin summering in La Malbaie, where he will visit every year for nearly forty years except for his term of office as president.

1896: The village itself is separated from the parish municipality and incorporated as the Village Municipality of La Malbaie.

1899: The luxurious 250-room Manoir Richelieu opens its doors to serve the flood of summertime visitors.

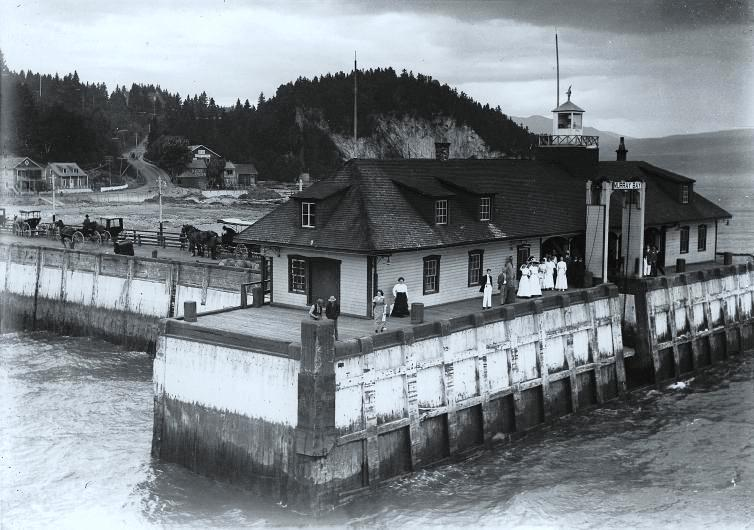
Murray Bay wharf, circa 1912

1914: Newly retired U.S. president William Howard Taft becomes president of the Murray Bay Golf Club, a position he will hold for seven years.

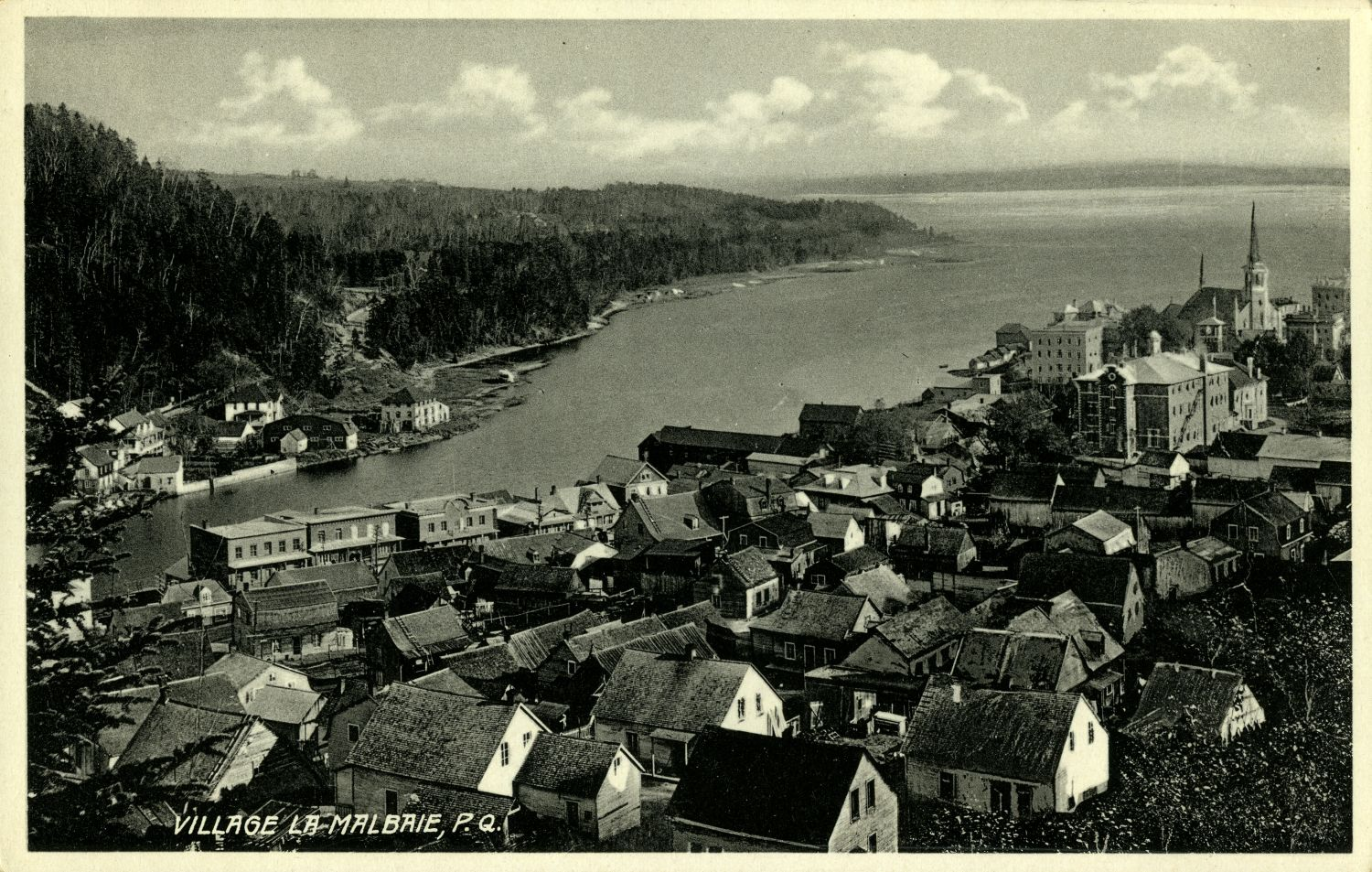
La Malbaie, postcard, c. 1920

1925: A second golf course opens, the competition-class Manoir Richelieu course.

1928: At the end of the tourist season, the Manoir Richelieu is completely destroyed by fire. It will be rebuilt before the next season begins in 1929.

1957: Saint-Étienne-de-Murray-Bay is renamed Saint-Étienne-de la-Malbaie.

1958: The Village Municipality of La Malbaie officially becomes a town.

1965: The Town of La Malbaie annexes the Parish Municipality of Saint-Étienne-de la-Malbaie.

1995: The Town of La Malbaie and the Village Municipality of Pointe-au-Pic merge to form the Town of La Malbaie–Pointe-au-Pic.

1999: The Municipalities of Rivière-Malbaie and Saint-Fidèle, the Village Municipality of Cap-à-l'Aigle, the Parish Municipality of Saint-Agnès, and the Town of La Malbaie–Pointe-au-Pic amalgamate to form the new Town of La Malbaie.

2018: La Malbaie's Manoir Richelieu plays host to the 44th G7 summit, hosted by Prime Minister Justin Trudeau.

La Malbaie has a long history as a holiday destination. Tourism in the area began to develop as far back as 1760 when the Scottish feudal lords John Nairne and Malcolm Fraser began receiving visitors to the region at their estates. The family of Charlotte Holt Gethings is thought to be among the very first to come to La Malbaie for summer holidays, beginning around 1840. Every summer, particularly from the late 1800s on, “Murray Bay” welcomed America's most fashionable families. They picnicked and played, went fishing and swimming, and entertained lavishly in their sprawling but modestly named “cottages” on The Boulevard (today's “Chemin des Falaises”). Many of their descendants still visit every summer to this day.

People called Murray Bay the “Newport of Canada.” US Tycoons mingled with mayors and governors and justices of the Supreme Court, there to escape the sweltering cities to the south. And conversation was “easy, intimate, and usually about golf” reported New Yorker magazine in 1924.

One regular visitor of note for nearly forty years was William Howard Taft, who served as president of the United States from 1909 to 1913. He once famously remarked that “The invigorating air of Murray Bay exhilarates like champagne without the effects of the morning after.” The residents of Murray Bay were very demonstrative in their affection for Taft, referring to him as “le petit juge,” lifting their caps to him as he drove by, and performing burlesque sketches during the winter months in which he was played by the most rotund villager. They burned a candle at the time of his death, and spat upon hearing of his betrayal by Theodore Roosevelt. Members of the Taft family are still a part of the local summer scene.

The American heritage of La Malbaie is still present in the inns and country homes, in bed & breakfasts frozen in time, and in the imposing Fairmont Manoir Richelieu, which hosted the world's political elite at the 44th G7 Summit in June 2018.

== Geography ==
La Malbaie is located in the Charlevoix Seismic Zone, which is the most active seismic zone in Eastern Canada. La Malbaie is notable for having an extremely high seismic risk, although a significant earthquake has not occurred in the region recently.

Rivers flowing through the municipality include:

- Comporté River
- Jacob River
- Mailloux River
- Malbaie River
- Port au Saumon River
- Rivière de Chicago
- Rivière Jean-Noël Nord-Est

== Demographics ==
In the 2021 Census of Population conducted by Statistics Canada, La Malbaie had a population of 8,235 living in 3,826 of its 4,563 total private dwellings, a change of −0.4% from its 2016 population of 8,271. With a land area of 458.19 km^{2} (176.91 sq mi), it had a population density of 18.0/km^{2} (46.5/sq mi) in 2021.

Historical census populations – La Malbaie, Quebec
Year	Pop.	±%
2001	9,143	—
2006	8,959	−2.0%
2011	8,862	−1.1%
2016	8,271	−6.7%
2021	8,235	−0.4%
Source: Statistics Canada

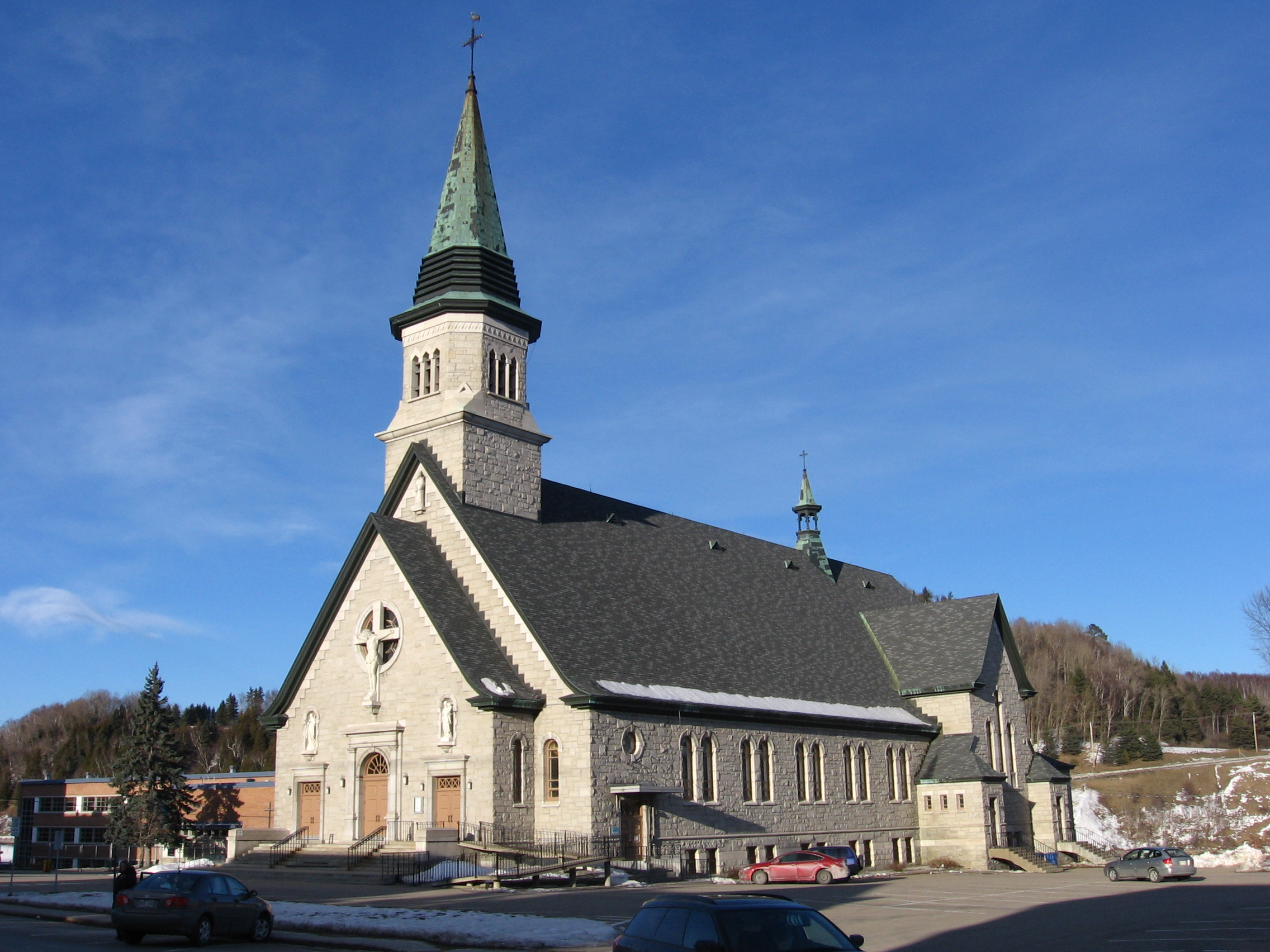
The church of La Malbaie near city hall

Mother tongue (2021):

- English as first language: 0.8%
- French as first language: 98.1%
- English and French as first language: 0.3%
- Other as first language: 0.6%

== Attractions ==
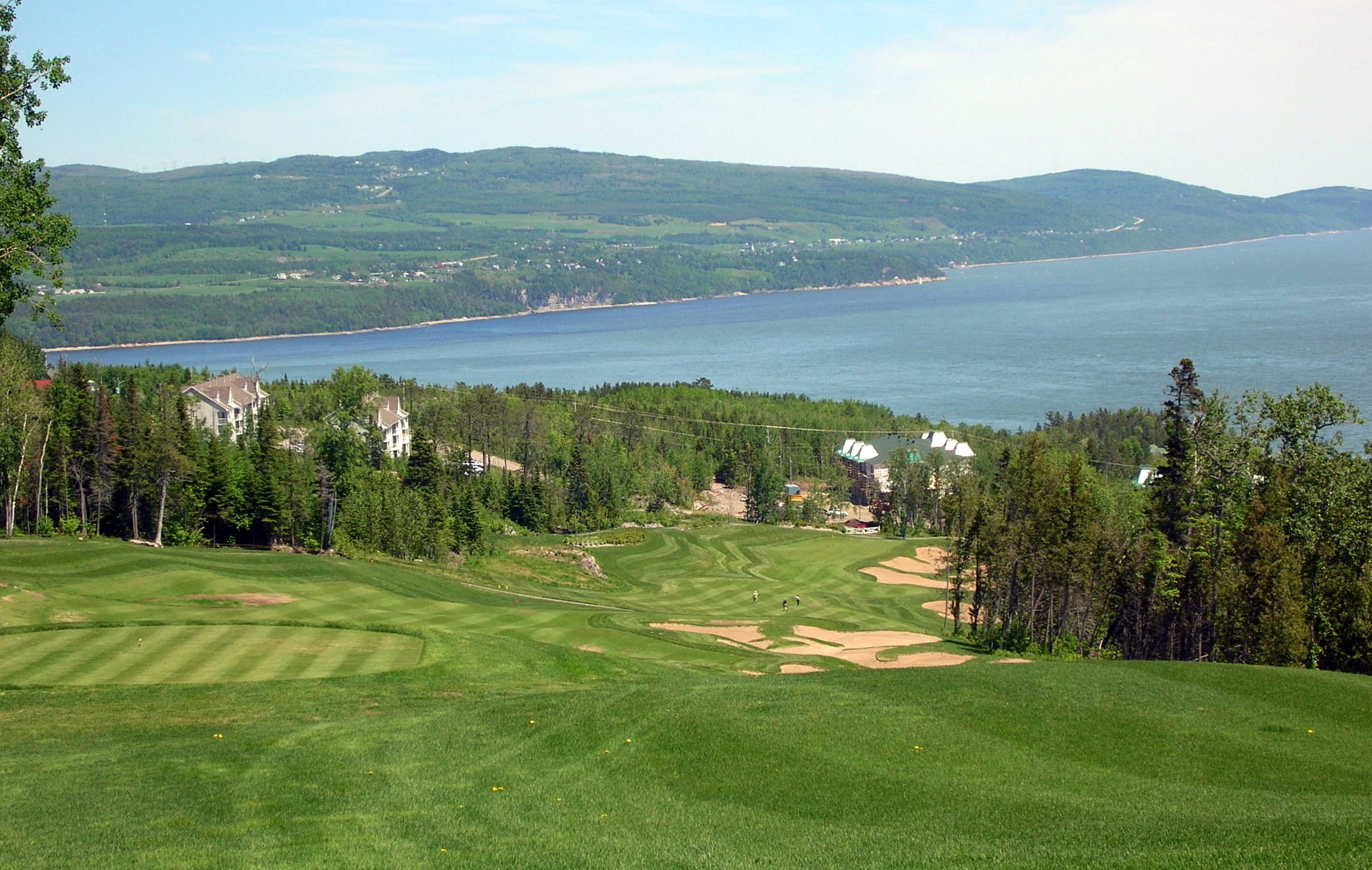
View of Malbaie from the Manoir Richelieu

La Malbaie's scenic beauty and closeness to nature have always been popular draws. A steamer menu from the earliest days of tourism included a note that “Many families from Quebec visit Malbaie in the summer for the benefit of saltwater bathing. There is also salmon fishing; sea trout are likewise taken here of a considerable size and several small lakes at a few miles distance afford abundance of trout.”

Modern visitors still come for the scenery, but most come to swim in the pools of the Manoir Richelieu, than in the salt-water river.

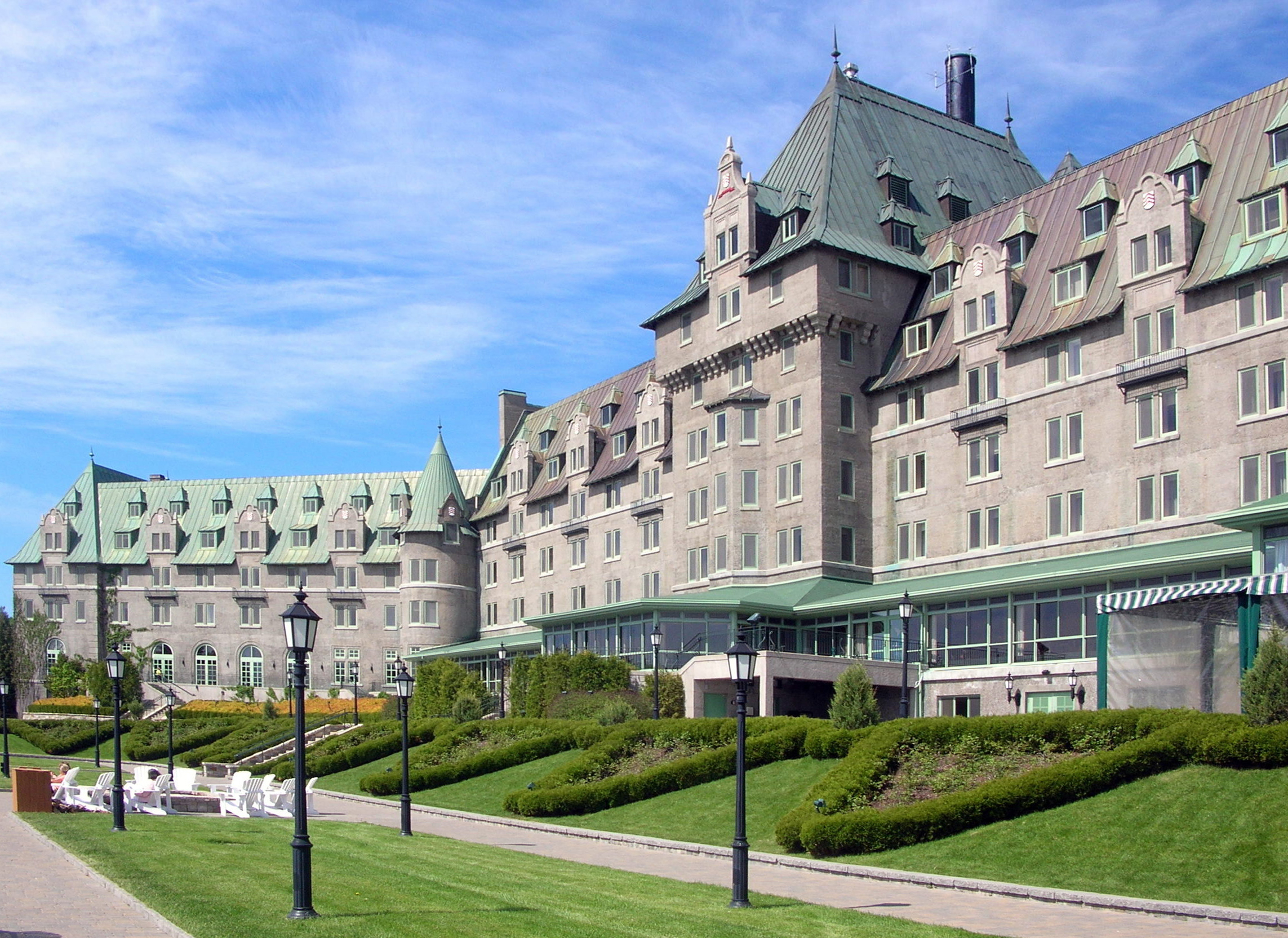
Fairmont Le Manoir Richelieu

La Malbaie's most noted landmark is the Fairmont Le Manoir Richelieu, a hotel operated under the Fairmont Hotels and Resorts banner. It was first built in 1899, then rebuilt in 1929 after it was destroyed by fire. The building was acquired by Fairmont in 1998 and reopened under the current banner in 1999. It is particularly noted for its panoramic location on a cliff overlooking the St. Lawrence River. The hotel hosted the 44th G7 summit, June 8–9, 2018. The Casino de Charlevoix is located next to the Manoir.

La Malbaie has two golf courses. The Manoir's is perched panoramically on the hilltop above the hotel, while the Murray Bay Golf Club is tucked into the bay near the centre of town.

Hautes-Gorges-de-la-Rivière-Malbaie National Park, about 40 kilometres (25 mi) northwest of town, is popular with outdoor enthusiasts. It features hiking and cycling trails and a scenic boat tour on the Malbaie River.

Mont Grand-Fonds is a ski hill located about 15 kilometres (9.3 mi) north of town. It features a vertical drop of 335 metres (1,099 ft) and average annual snowfall of 500 centimetres (200 in). It also has 140 kilometres (87 mi) of cross-country ski trails and 41 kilometres (25 mi) of snowshoe trails.

Musée de Charlevoix is a museum of history and popular art located within walking distance of many local hotels and inns.

The Cap-à-l'Aigle sector of La Malbaie (across the bay from the main part of town) is a member of "Quebec's association of most beautiful villages". With its many heritage residences and inns, it is a popular place to go for a stroll, particularly in June when its lilac trees are in full bloom. Cap-à-l’Aigle also has a marina.

Agrotourism is popular in La Malbaie and throughout Charlevoix, with many local producers welcoming visitors.

Observatoire de l’Astroblème de Charlevoix is an interpretation centre on the meteorite origins of Charlevoix's geography.

Although the whales don't often venture as far upriver as La Malbaie, the town is within easy driving distance of Tadoussac, where visitors can take a whale-watching tour and visit the Saguenay Fjord.

== Government ==
List of former mayors of the former Village/Town of La Malbaie (1896–1995):

- J. S. Perrault, 1896–1898
- Joseph Couturier, 1898–1907
- Alphonse Guay, 1907–1910
- E. J. Duggan, 1910–1913
- Joseph-Arthur Lapointe, 1913–1916; 1921–1924
- Joseph-Edouard Cauchon, 1917–1920
- Rolland Warren, 1920
- Joseph T. Tremblay, 1925–1930
- Ernest Carré, 1930–1939
- Ludovic Couturier, 1939–1941
- Jean-Charles Rochette, 1941–1948
- Alcide Harvey, 1948–1951
- Henri-Paul Couturier, 1951
- Boris Maltais, 1951–1958
- Martial Asselin, 1958–1963
- Louis-Philippe Dufour, 1964–1965
- Paul X. Laberge, 1966–1970
- Lucien Harvey, 1970–1986
- Claudette B. Bergeron, 1986–1989
- Jules Maltais, 1989–1995

List of former mayors of La Malbaie—Pointe-au-Pic (1995–1999):

- Jean Lajoie, 1995
- Louis Bergeron, 1995–1999

List of former mayors of La Malbaie:

- Louis Bergeron, 1999–2002
- Jean-Luc Simard, 2002–2009
- Lise Lapointe, 2009-2013
- Michel Couturier, 2013–present

== Notable people ==
- Laure Conan (1845–1924), pen name of Marie-Louise-Félicité Angers, French-Canadian novelist
- Francis Cabot (1925–2011), American gardener and horticulturalist
- Ann-Renée Desbiens (born 1994), Olympic gold and silver medalist in ice hockey, goaltender for Montreal Victoire, and member of the Canada women's national ice hockey team
- Valérie Harvey (born 1979), writer and sociologist

== See also ==
- 1925 Charlevoix–Kamouraska earthquake
- Charlevoix tourist train
- List of cities in Quebec
