= Museum of Charlevoix =

Museum of Charlevoix, Québec
- Location within Quebec
- Location: 10 chemin du Havre; La Malbaie, Quebec, Canada
- Coordinates: 47.63125°N 70.141729°W
- Type: Art museum
- Website: http://www.museedecharlevoix.qc.ca

The Musée de Charlevoix (Charlevoix Museum) is a museum of art, ethnology and history located in La Malbaie, in the natural region of Charlevoix, in the province of Québec, in Canada. Its collection includes nearly 9000 objects and 6000 archival documents.

== History ==
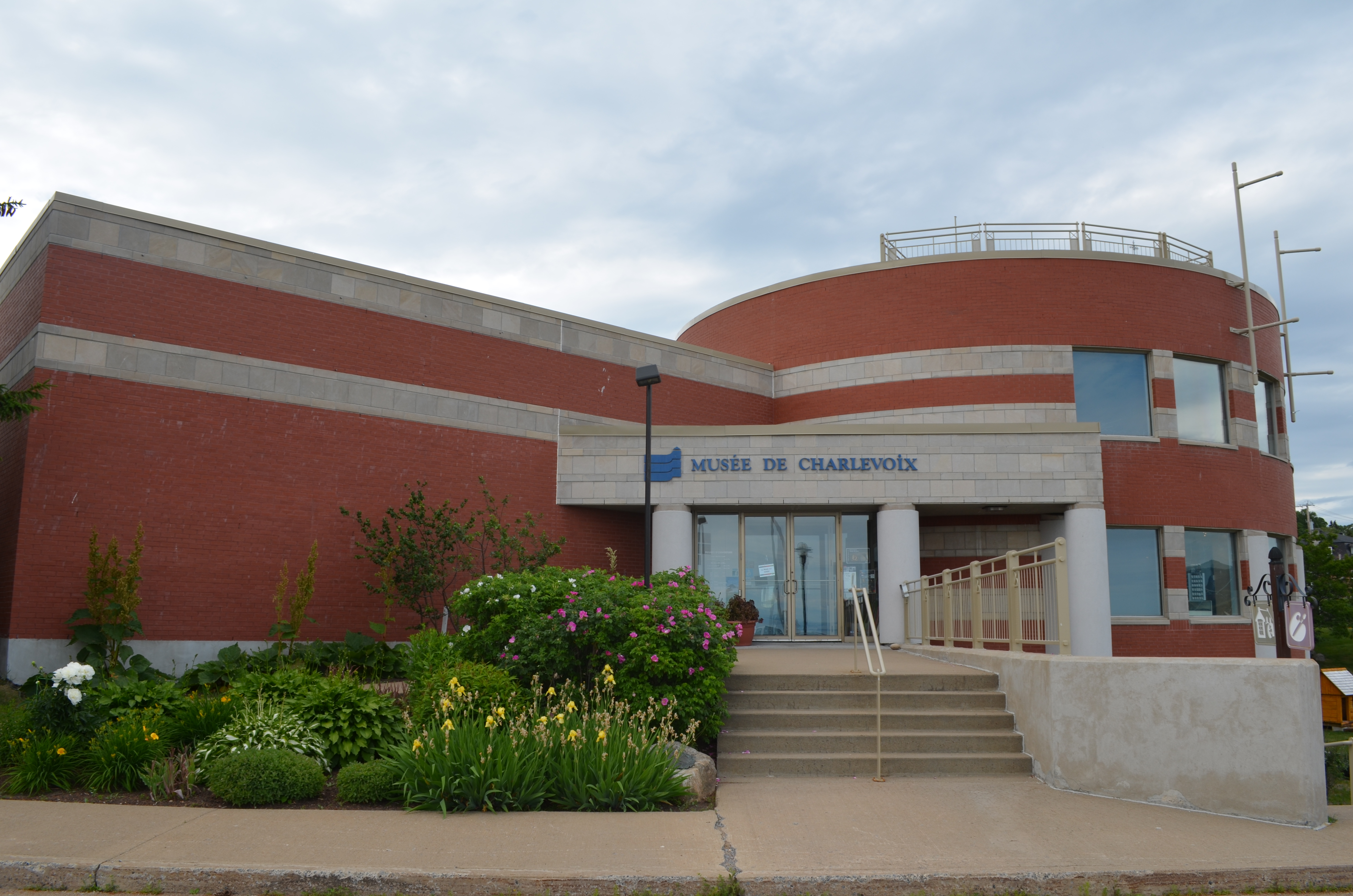
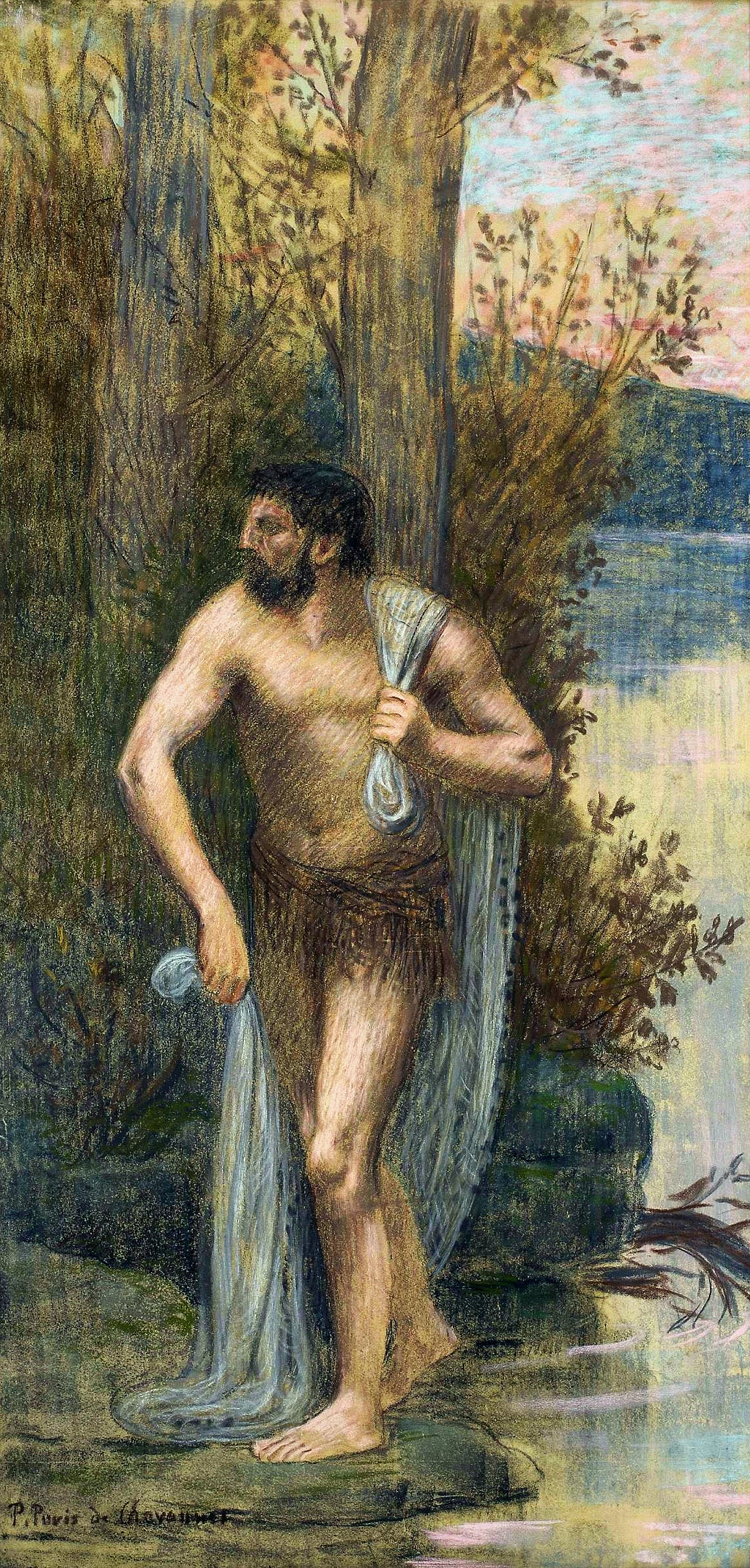
The Musée de Charlevoix building inaugurated in 1990

Since the early 20th century, the Charlevoix region has been regularly visited by many artists, such as Clarence Gagnon or André Biéler. As early as the 1930s, American painter Patrick Morgan (1904–1982) and his wife Maud Cabot (1903–1999) were American vacationers, who settled in Cap-à-l'Aigle, near La Malbaie. They launched the idea of a museum dedicated to the popular art of the region.

In 1946, Roland Gagné, a collector from Pointe-au-Pic, near La Malbaie, created a private museum behind his home, which he named Laure-Conan Regional Museum. This first establishment took on a new dimension in 1975, when the collections were set up in the former La Malbaie post office.

In 1990, the museum moved to a building located in Pointe-au-Pic and took the name of Musée de Charlevoix in 1992.

== Collections ==
=== Ethnohistory ===
The Musée de Charlevoix houses an important collection of 4000 objects of Charlevoix ethnohistory. It includes furniture, clothing, toys and tools, many of which come from the personal collection of Roland Gagné.

Public and private archives, old photographs, postcards and plans have been added since 1975.

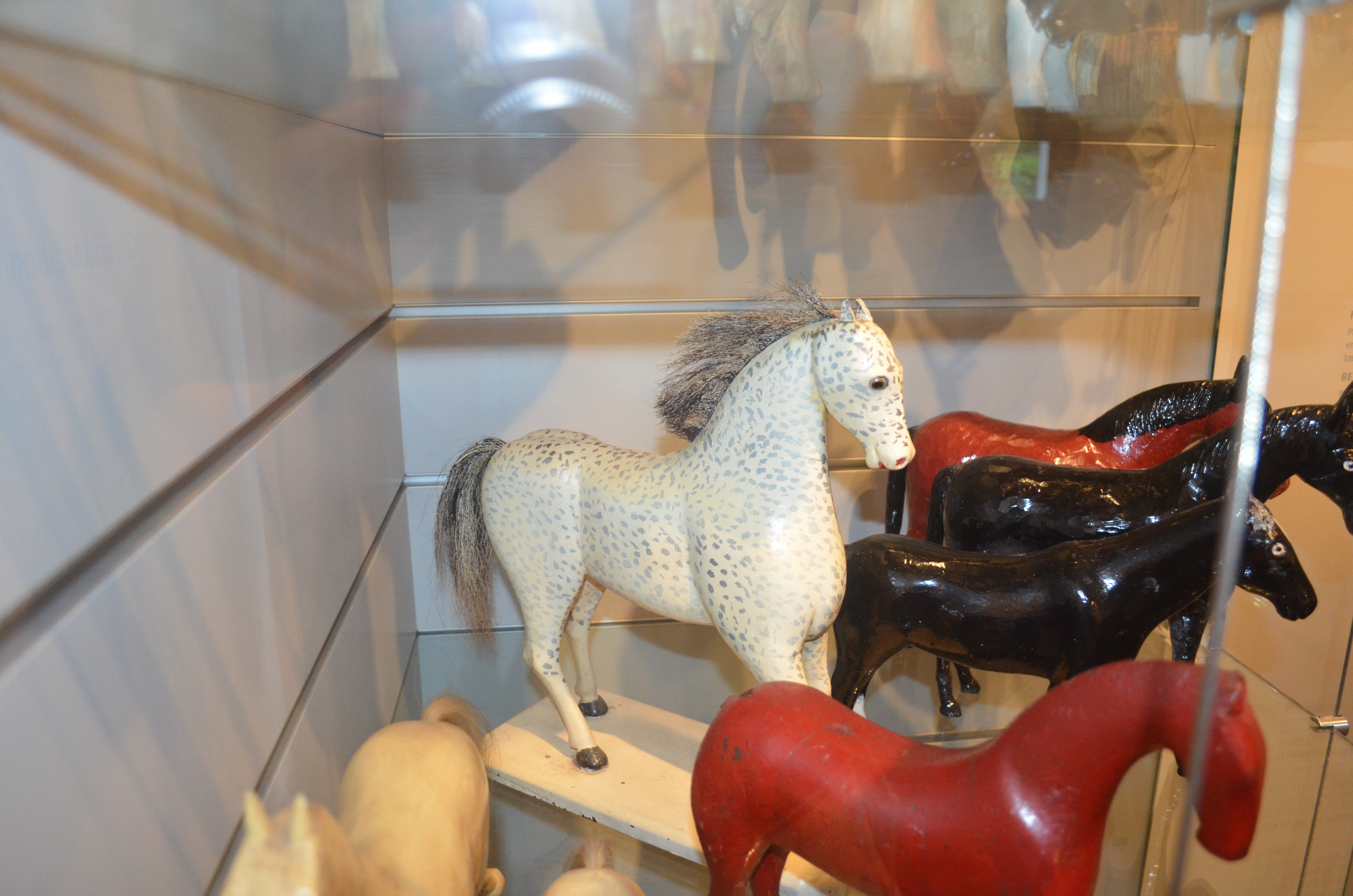
Carved wooden horses (early 20th century).

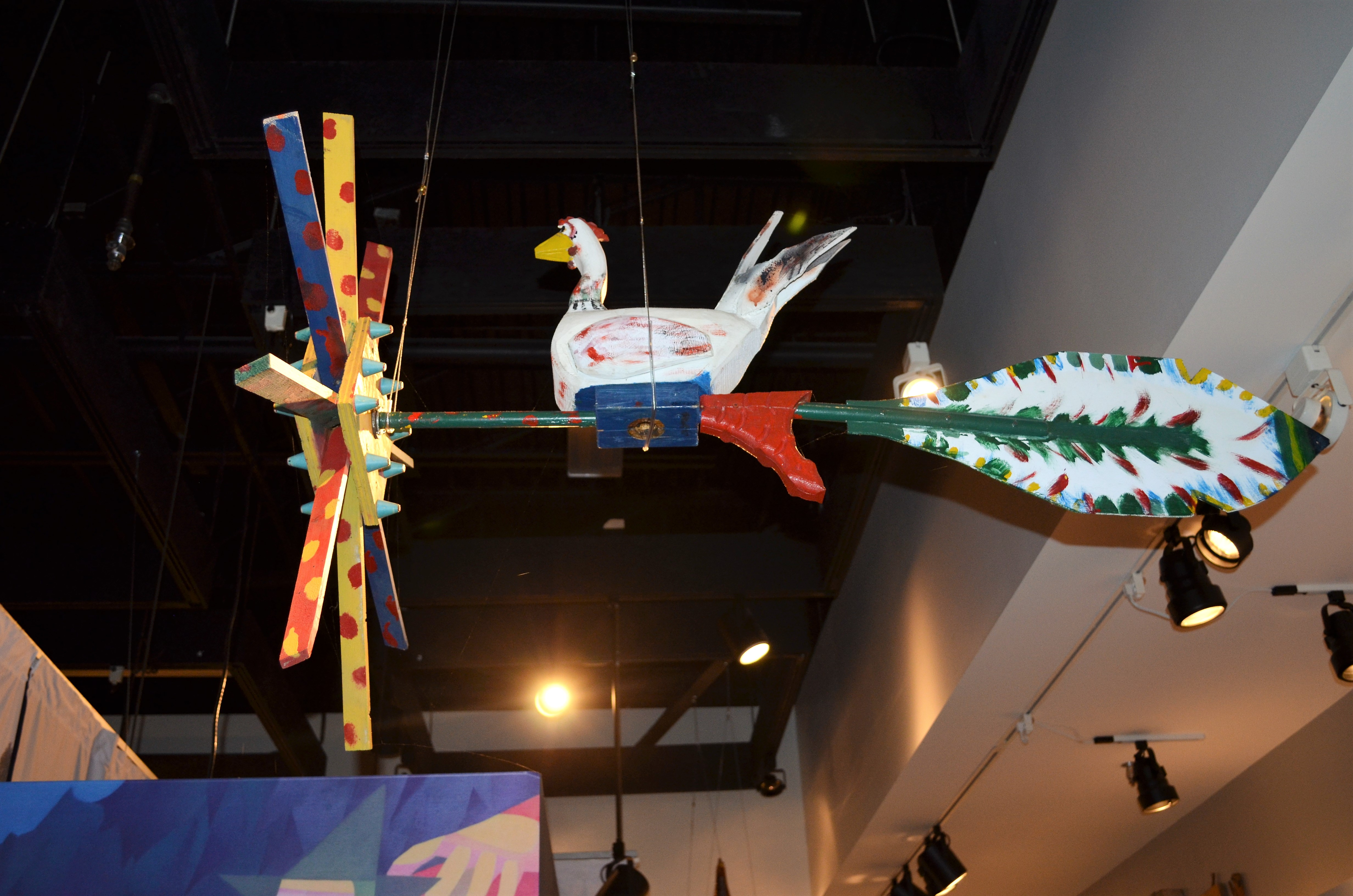
Vire-vent
(early 20th century).

=== Art ===
The museum gathers a large number of works of art, especially paintings and sculptures. These are works by well-known artists: Clarence Gagnon, René Richard, Georges-Henry Duquet and popular artists such as Roger Ouellette and Robert Cauchon (naive art, art brut).

== Exhibitions and events ==
The Musée de Charlevoix presents a dozen exhibitions each year. Some are devoted to artists, solo or not, others to themes of ethnohistory, and still others to recent acquisitions.

== See also ==
- La Malbaie
- Laure Conan
