= Manoir Richelieu =

Hotel in La Malbaie, Quebec

Coordinates: 47.620°N 70.145°W

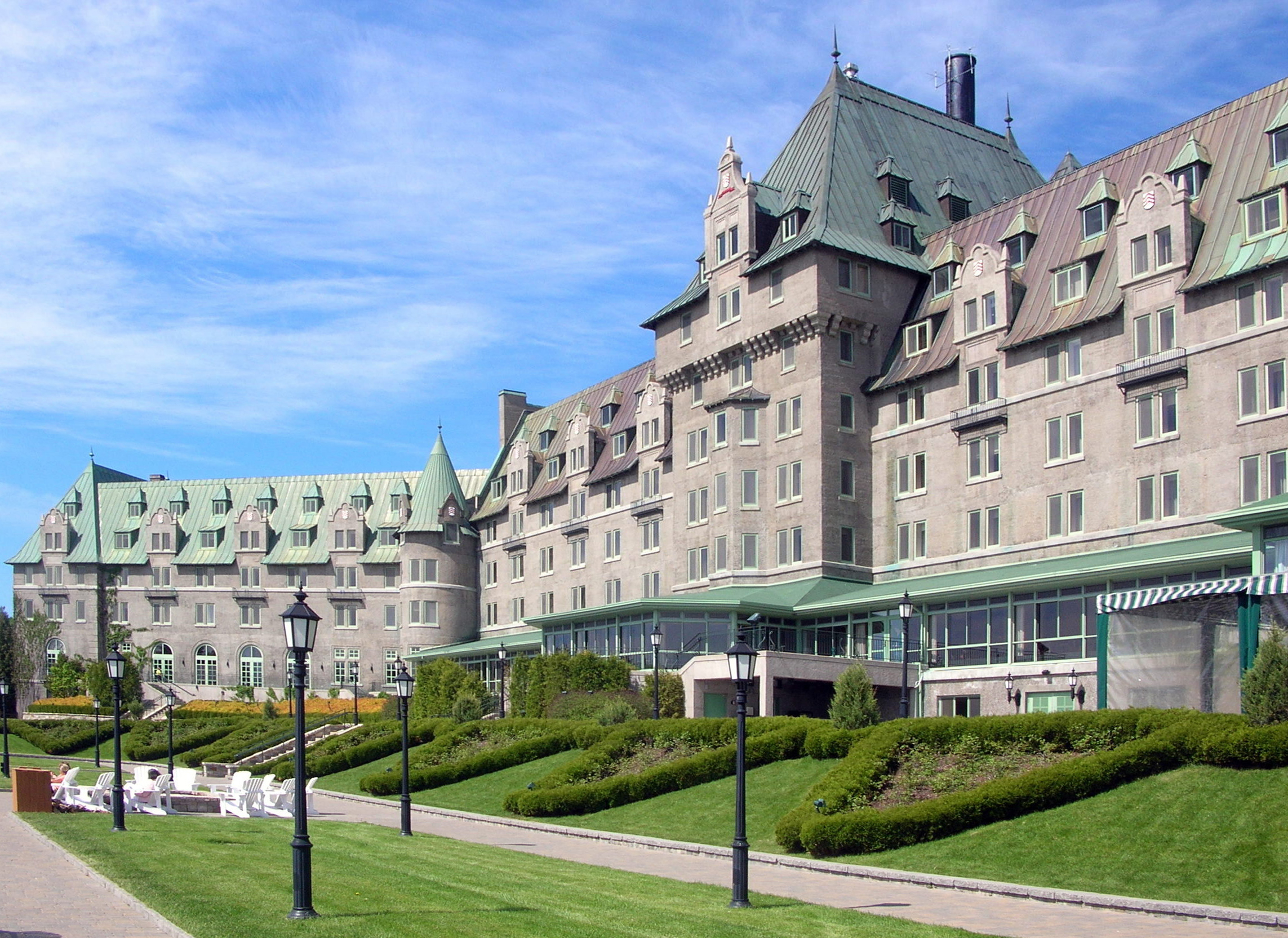
Fairmont Le Manoir Richelieu

The Fairmont Le Manoir Richelieu is a historic hotel operated by Fairmont Hotels in La Malbaie, Quebec, Canada. The hotel was first built in 1899 but then burned down in 1928. The hotel was rebuilt in 1929 in the Châteauesque style, designed by Canadian architect John Smith Archibald in the style of a French castle. About 150 kilometres (93 mi) northeast of Quebec City, the hotel sits on a cliff along the St Lawrence River. It has 405 guest rooms and four restaurants.

== Associated facilities ==
U.S. president William Taft opened the hotel's 27 hole golf course in 1925 which was designed by British architect Herbert Strong.

The Casino de Charlevoix adjoins the hotel and can be accessed via an underground passage. It is owned by Fairmont and the Quebec government.

== Ownership history ==
Owned by Canada Steamship Lines, it was sold in 1966 to Warnock Hersey. In 1971, the hotel was sold to American real estate developer John B. Dempsey, II of Cleveland. He ran the hotel with a private ownership group until 1975 after which it was sold to the Quebec provincial government and then to Raymond Malenfant in 1985.

In 1998, Loto-Québec partnered with Canadian Pacific Hotels (which became Fairmont) and the Solidarity Fund QFL to acquire the Manoir Richelieu. Fairmont Hotels rebranded and reopened the hotel in June 1999 after a $140 million renovation and expansion.

== Notable events ==
In 1985, businessperson Raymond Malenfant bought the hotel from the Province of Quebec for $555,555.55 (equivalent to $1,447,972 in 2025). Malenfant refused to recognize the union for the then 300-350 employees at the hotel, claiming he had bought the building, not the collective agreement. Two of Malenfant's cars were torched. Workers broke into the hotel and ransacked the facilities resulting in 71 arrests. One person died of suffocation while in police custody. After an extended conflict all the workers lost their jobs and the union was crushed. Malenfant, worth hundreds of millions in the 1980s, was bankrupt by the early 1990s because of the dispute. The dispute is considered one of the nastiest in Quebec labour history.

The hotel served as the main venue of the 44th G7 summit on June 8–9, 2018. This involved rings of security as world leaders and staff gathered.

The hotel served as the main venue of a summit of the G7 foreign ministers on March 13-14, 2025.

== See also ==
- History of Quebec#Late 20th century Quebec (1960–1999)
