= 44th G7 summit =

2018 international leader meeting in Canada

Coordinates: 47°37′14″N 70°8′44″W

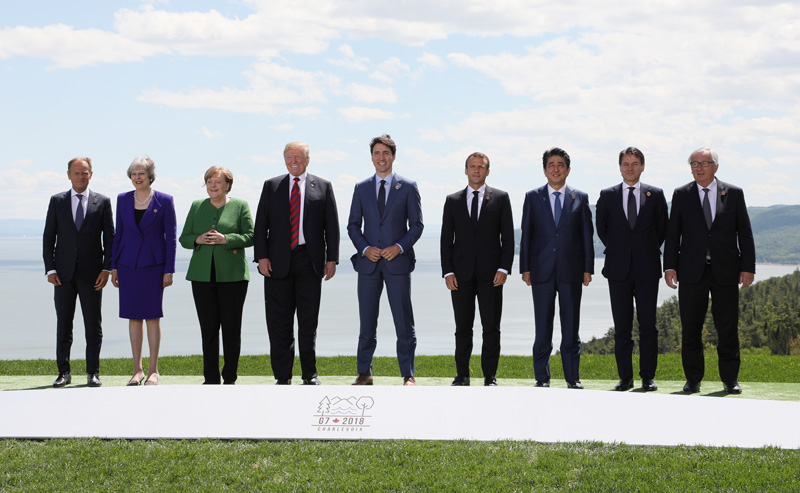
- Host country: Canada
- Date: 8–9 June 2018
- Cities: La Malbaie
- Venues: Fairmont Le Manoir Richelieu
- Participants: Canada; France; Germany; Italy; Japan; United Kingdom; United States; European Union; Invited guests: Argentina; Bangladesh; Haiti; Jamaica; Kenya; Marshall Islands; Norway; Rwanda; Senegal; Seychelles; South Africa; Vietnam
- Follows: 43rd G7 summit
- Precedes: 45th G7 summit

The 44th G7 summit was held on 8–9 June 2018, in La Malbaie in the Charlevoix region of Quebec, Canada. This was the sixth time since 1981 that Canada has hosted the meetings.

In March 2014, the Group of Seven (G7)—comprising leaders of Canada, France, Germany, Italy, Japan, the United Kingdom, and the United States—declared that a meaningful discussion was currently not possible with Russia in the context of the G8. Since then, meetings have continued within the G7 process. On the first day of the summit, the United States announced that it would push for the reinstatement of Russia. Italy also requested a restoration of the G8 shortly after. US President Donald Trump also pushed for other countries to recognize Crimea as part of Russia, and stated that Ukraine was "one of the most corrupt countries in the world" to G7 leaders.

The summit received much attention due to a significant decline of relations of members with the United States. As a result, the summit was dubbed the “G6+1" by France and some members of the media, signifying the "isolation of the United States” in light of recent events.

== Host ==
The Fairmont Le Manoir Richelieu in La Malbaie, Quebec, Canada, was chosen as the host of the G7 summit, in part due to its natural beauty and security. It is the first G7 summit to be hosted by Quebec since 1981. La Malbaie, once a resort town that hosted American presidents, required US$465 million in preparations, including new high-speed internet service, new cellphone towers, and security fences. Kelowna, British Columbia, was also considered as a potential host.

== Agenda and preparation ==
In May 2017, Canadian Prime Minister Justin Trudeau stated that he intended to "showcase both its domestic and international priorities: to strengthen the middle class, advance gender equality, fight climate change, and promote respect for diversity and inclusion".

In June 2017, Peter Boehm was appointed as Deputy Minister for the G7 Summit and Personal Representative of the Prime Minister after serving as the Canadian G7 Sherpa since 2012.

In December 2017, Trudeau unveiled the summit logo and announced five key themes that Canada would advance once it assumed the Presidency of the G7 on 1 January 2018.

- Investing in growth that works for everyone
- Preparing for jobs of the future
- Advancing gender equality and women's empowerment
- Working together on climate change, oceans and clean energy
- Building a more peaceful and secure world

=== Economic growth ===
The notion of "economic growth that works for everyone" or "equitable growth", known as 'Croissance Équitable' in French, is rooted in the papal encyclical Rerum novarum which has had a profound influence on the economic thought of French and Quebecois policy makers—including Pierre Elliott Trudeau and other alumni of the Université de Montréal.

It holds that governments and institutional investors must always have in mind the best interests of employees when making investment decisions—including decent wages and pension benefits. Engaged employee-nominated pension board members are expected to contribute to the development of the equitable investment ethos that will drive this economic approach.

=== Gender equality ===
Canadian and French thought leaders have stressed the need to achieve gender equality across all economic sectors by using modern, quantitative managerial tools that can help more precisely measure gender pay gaps and thus inform corrective policy measures at both the corporate and government level. Meeting in Paris, Montreal and Toronto in the weeks leading up to the Charlevoix summit, Canadian and European asset owners and policy makers agreed on the need to step up and assume more responsibility for the advancement of women's rights and other "related social parameters" across all assets classes.

In that perspective, Canadian Prime Minister Justin Trudeau is expected to announce a distinct G7 sustainability initiative focusing specifically on gender diversity across global capital markets—for which "the Canada Pension Plan, OMERS, the Caisse de dépôt et placement du Québec and the Ontario Teachers' Pension Plan are each expected to pitch in [initially] $1 million apiece, with another $5 million from the federal government."

Melinda Gates and Isabelle Hudon served as co-chairs of the Gender Equality Advisory Council created by the Trudeau government for the G7 summit.

=== Climate change, oceans and clean energy ===
World Pensions Council (WPC) economist Nicolas J. Firzli has argued that, in spite of the United States withdrawal from the Paris Agreement, the G7-driven process of international consensus-building could still be tilted in favor of renewed cooperation towards the attainment of the Sustainable Development Goals—thanks notably to Justin Trudeau's multilateralist approach and the rapid shift towards ESG-informed investment policies amongst US and Canadian institutional investors.

=== Declarations issued ===
The "Charlevoix Commitment on Defending Democracy from Foreign Threats" was one of eight declarations—also known as statements of commitment—issued by the G7 leaders on 9 June 2018. Charlevoix Commitment states that "foreign actors seek to undermine our democratic societies and institutions, our electoral processes, our sovereignty and our security. These malicious, multi-faceted and ever-evolving tactics constitute a serious strategic threat which we commit to confront together, working together with other governments that share our democratic values." The Charlevoix Summit resolved to establish a G7 Rapid Response Mechanism "to strengthen our coordination to identify and respond to diverse and evolving threats to our democracies, including through sharing information and analysis, and identifying opportunities for coordinated response."

== Leaders at the summit ==
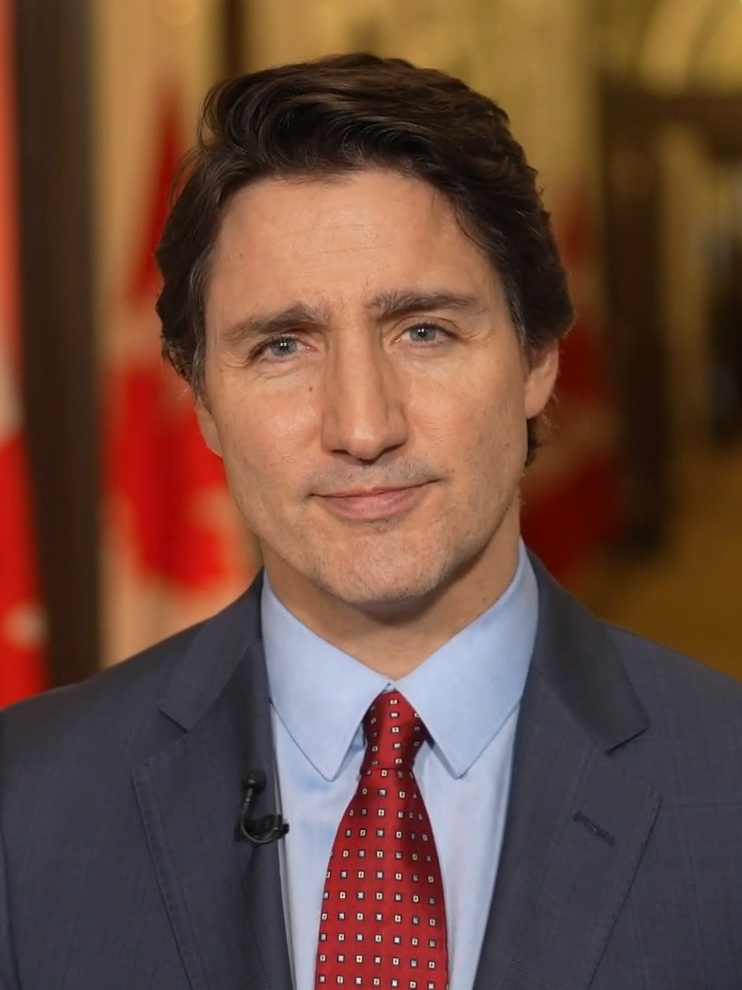
Justin Trudeau chaired the 44th G7 summit.

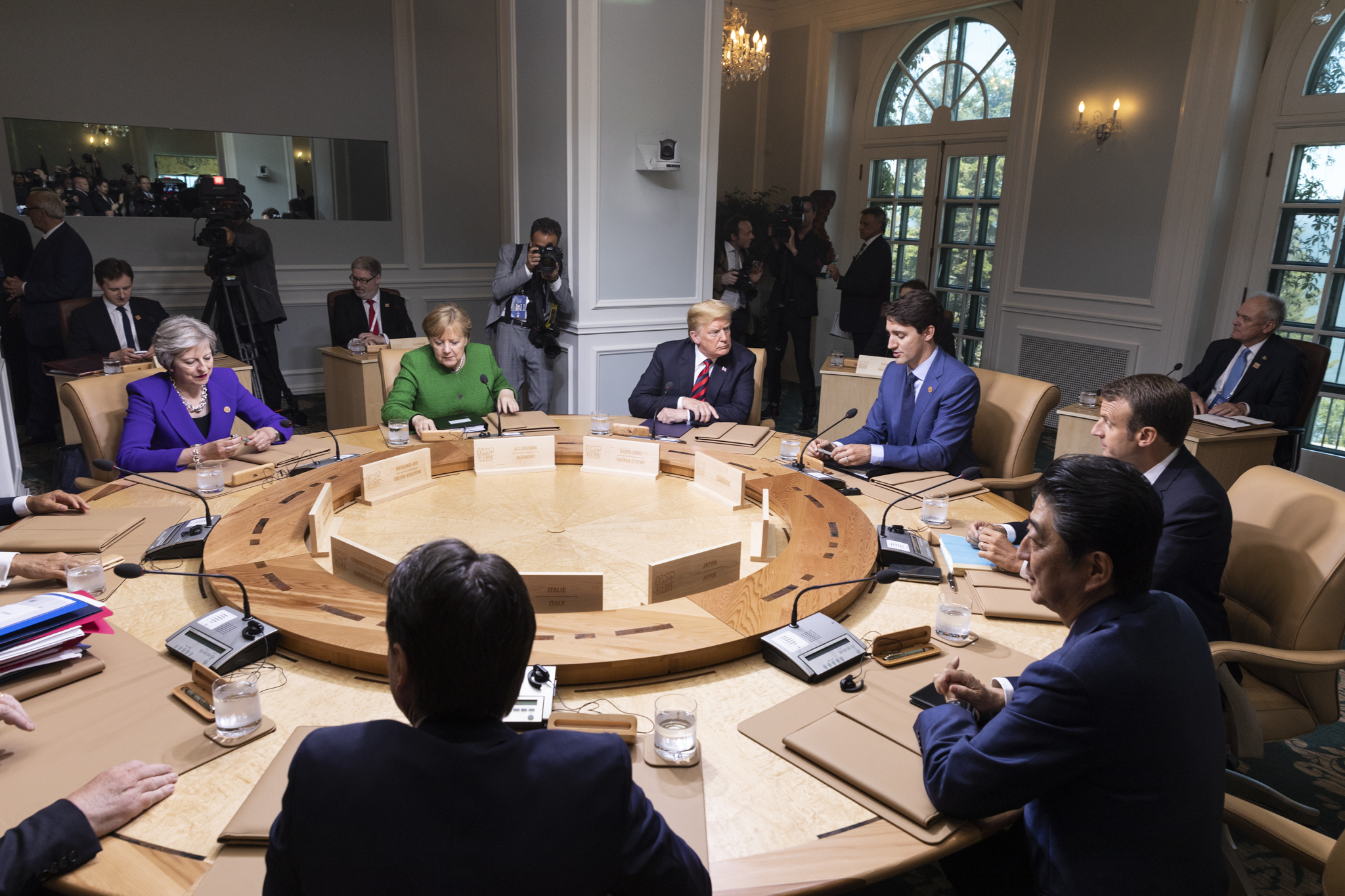
Working session on 8 June 2018

The attendees included the leaders of the seven G7 member states as well as representatives of the European Union. The President of the European Commission has always been invited to all meetings and decision-making since 1981.

The 44th G7 summit was the first summit for Italian Prime Minister Giuseppe Conte. It was also the final summit for British Prime Minister Theresa May and Commission President Jean-Claude Juncker.

=== Participants ===
**Core G7 members** Host state and leader are shown in bold text.
Member		Represented by	Title
(Canada)	**Canada**	**Justin Trudeau**	**Prime Minister**
(France)	France	Emmanuel Macron	President
(Germany)	Germany	Angela Merkel	Chancellor
(Italy)	Italy	Giuseppe Conte	Prime Minister
(Japan)	Japan	Shinzō Abe	Prime Minister
(United Kingdom)	United Kingdom	Theresa May	Prime Minister
(United States)	United States	Donald Trump	President
(European Union)	European Union	Jean-Claude Juncker	Commission President
(European Union)	European Union	Donald Tusk	Council President
**Guest Invitees (Countries)**
Member		Represented by	Title
(Argentina)	Argentina	Mauricio Macri	President
(Bangladesh)	Bangladesh	Sheikh Hasina	Prime Minister
(Haiti)	Haiti	Jovenel Moïse	President
(Jamaica)	Jamaica	Andrew Holness	Prime Minister
(Kenya)	Kenya	Uhuru Kenyatta	President
(Marshall Islands)	Marshall Islands	Hilda Heine	President
(Norway)	Norway	Erna Solberg	Prime Minister
(Rwanda)	Rwanda	Paul Kagame	President
(Senegal)	Senegal	Macky Sall	President
(Seychelles)	Seychelles	Danny Faure	President
(South Africa)	South Africa	Cyril Ramaphosa	President
(Vietnam)	Vietnam	Nguyễn Xuân Phúc	Prime Minister

== Gallery of participating leaders ==
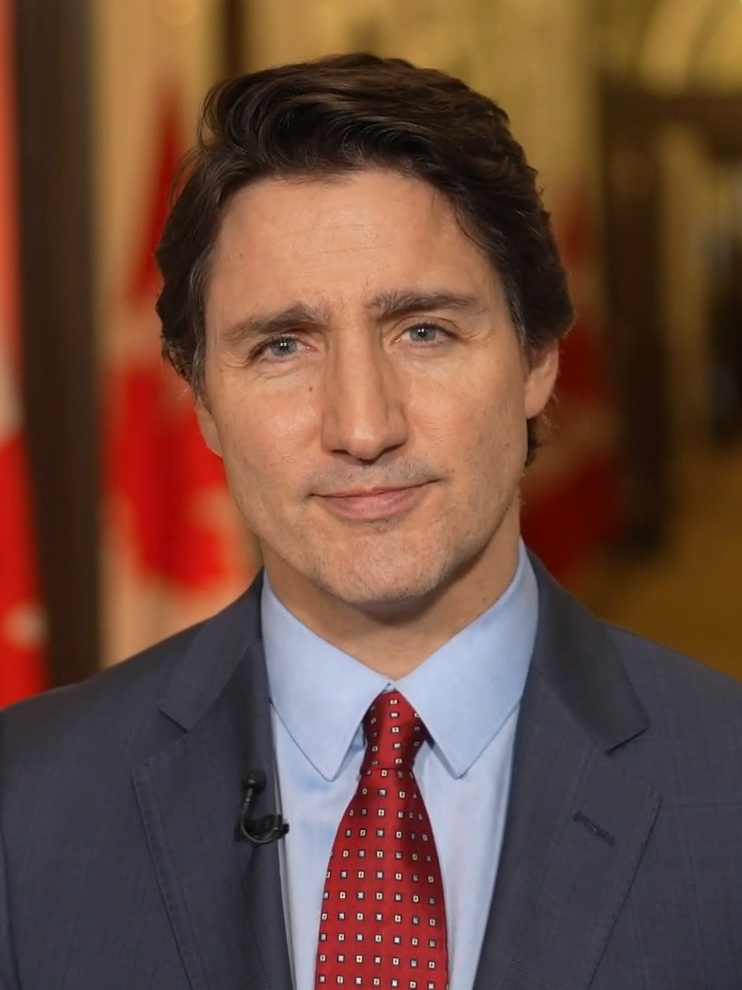
(Canada) Canada
Justin Trudeau,
Prime Minister (Host)

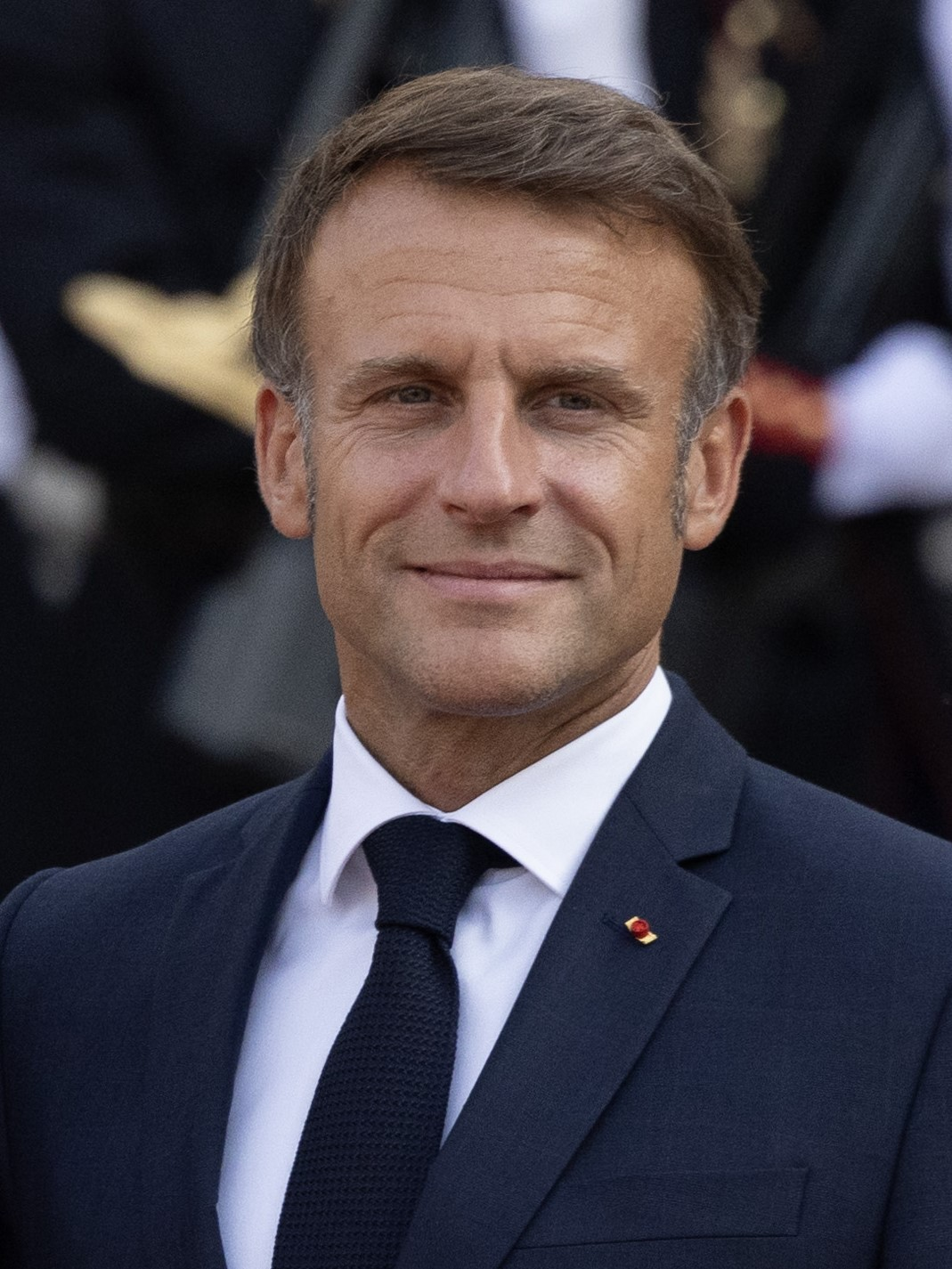
(France) France
Emmanuel Macron,
President

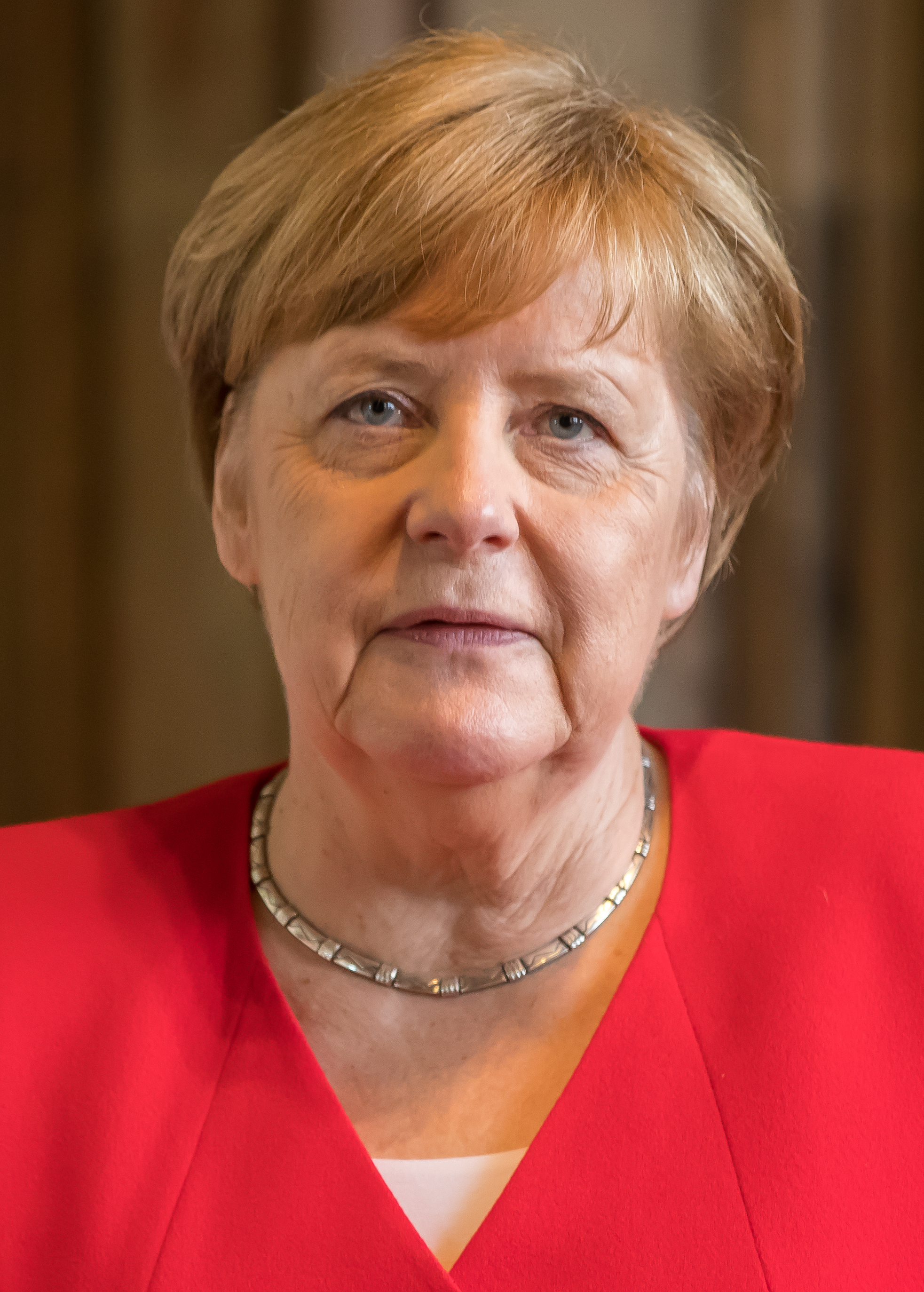
(Germany) Germany
Angela Merkel,
Chancellor

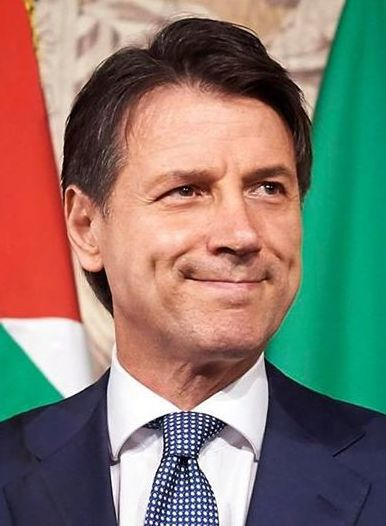
(Italy) Italy
Giuseppe Conte,
Prime Minister

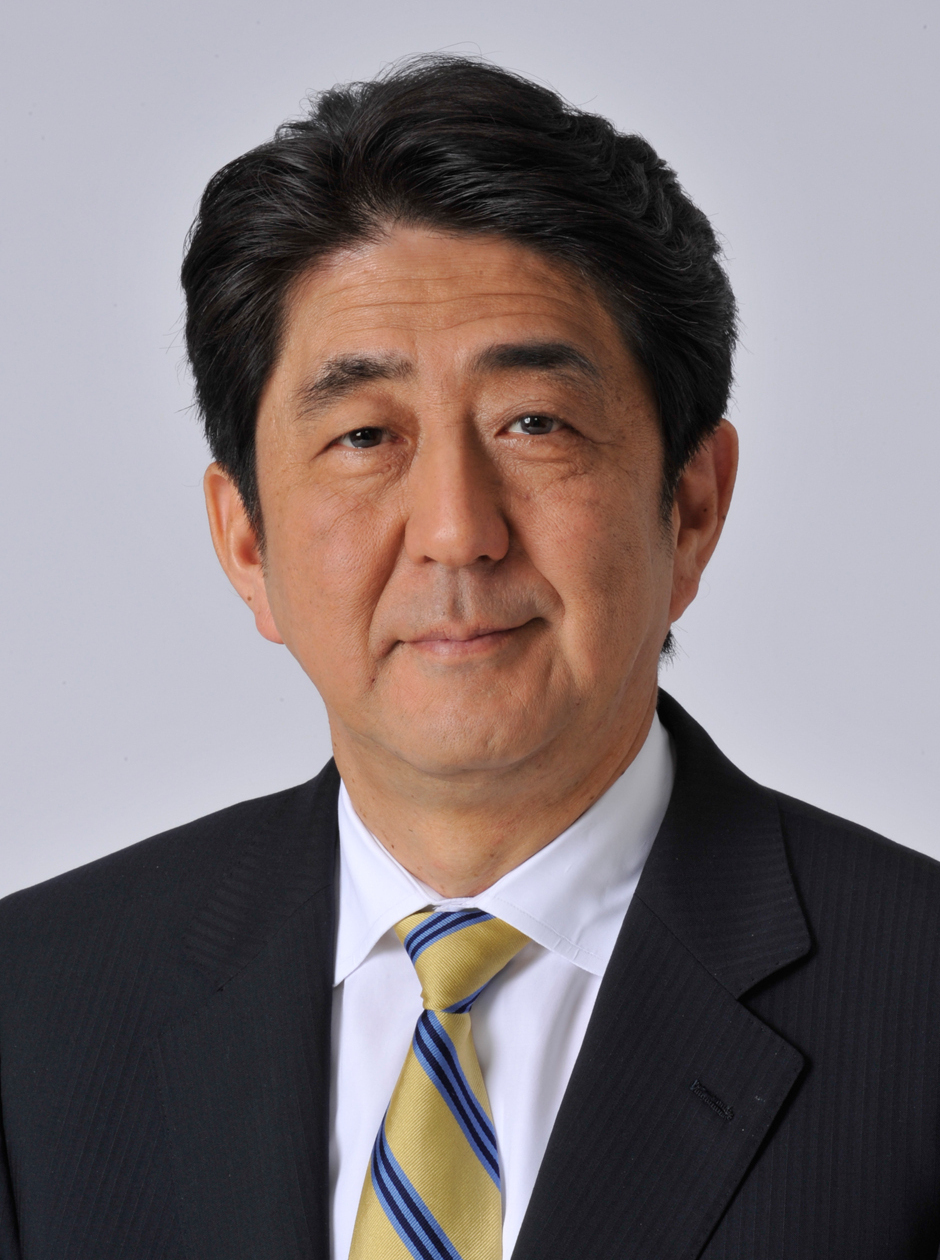
(Japan) Japan
Shinzō Abe,
Prime Minister

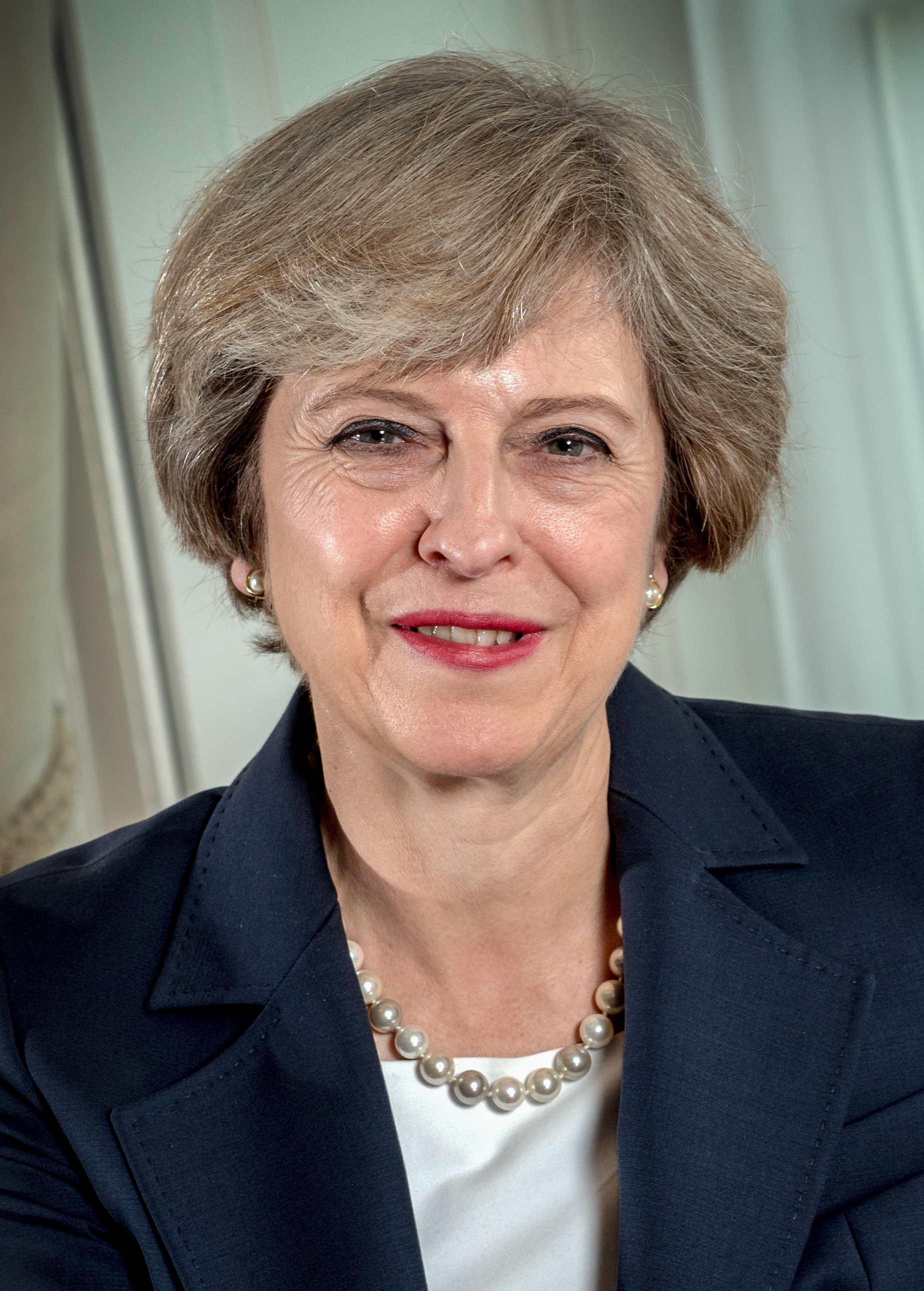
(United Kingdom) United Kingdom
Theresa May
Prime Minister

(United States) United States
Donald Trump,
President
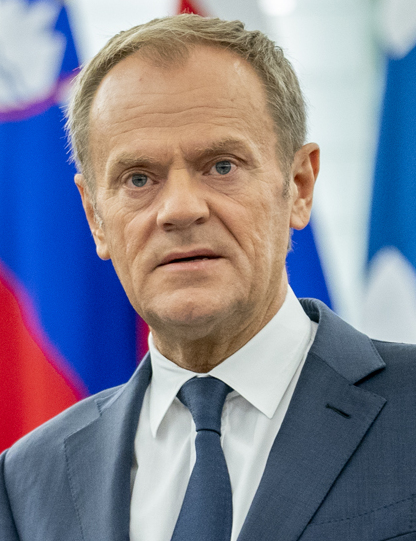
(European Union) European Union
Donald Tusk, Council President

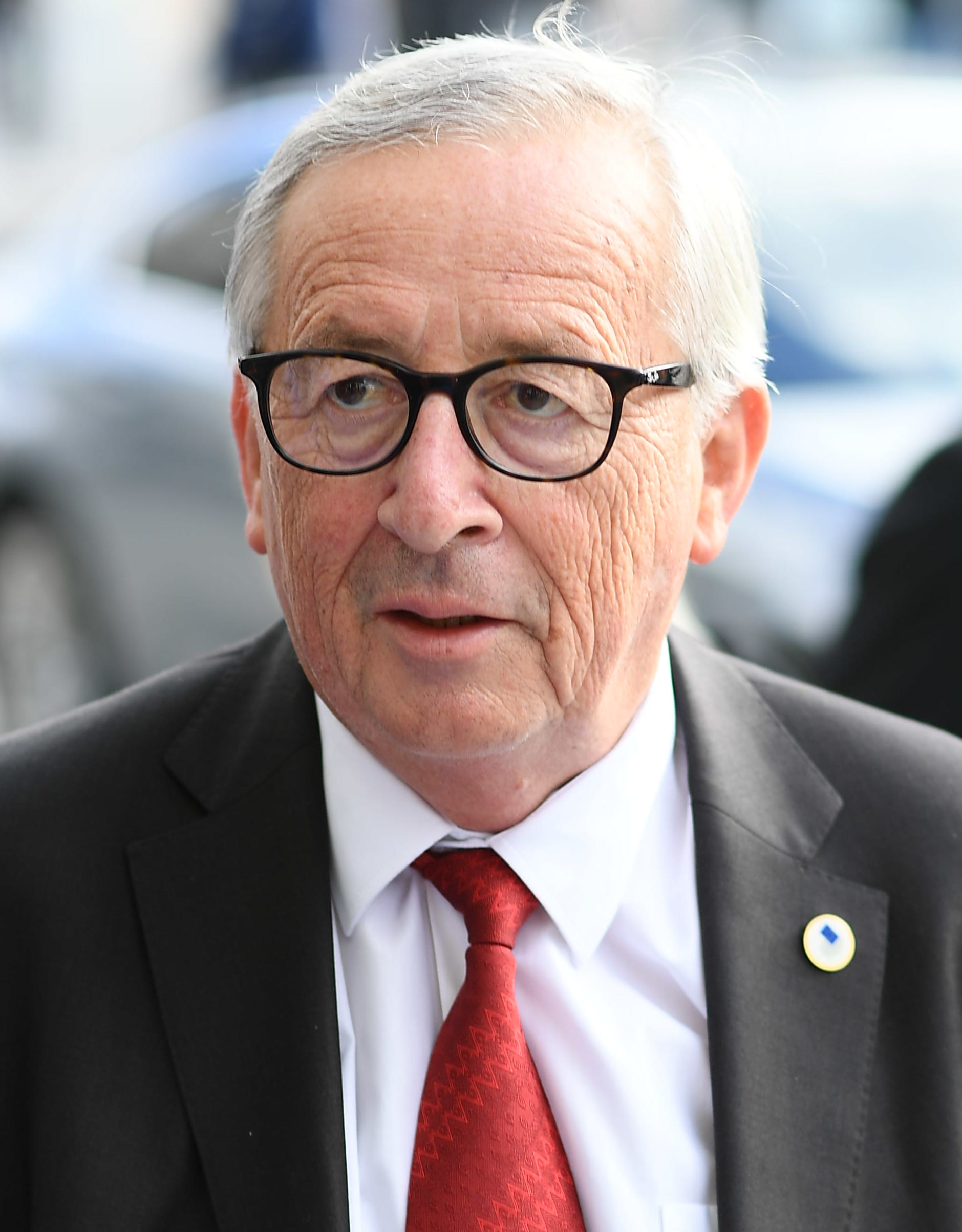
(European Union) European Union
Jean-Claude Juncker, Commission President

=== Invited guests ===
==== Heads of government ====
The following leaders were invited to the Outreach Session of the G7 summit.

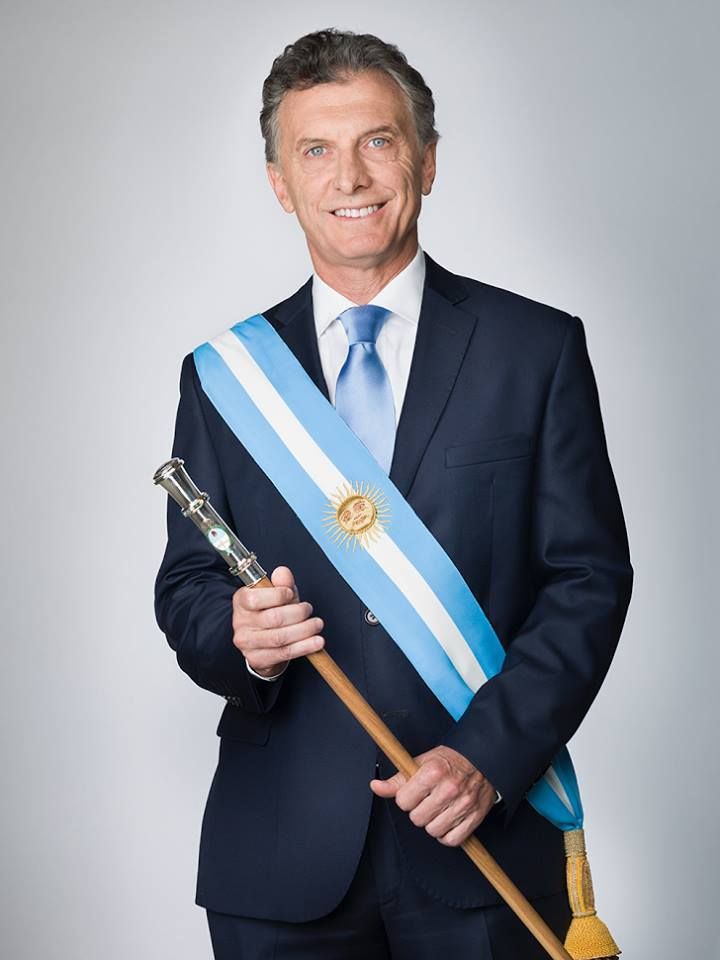
Argentina
Mauricio Macri,
President and Chair of the G20

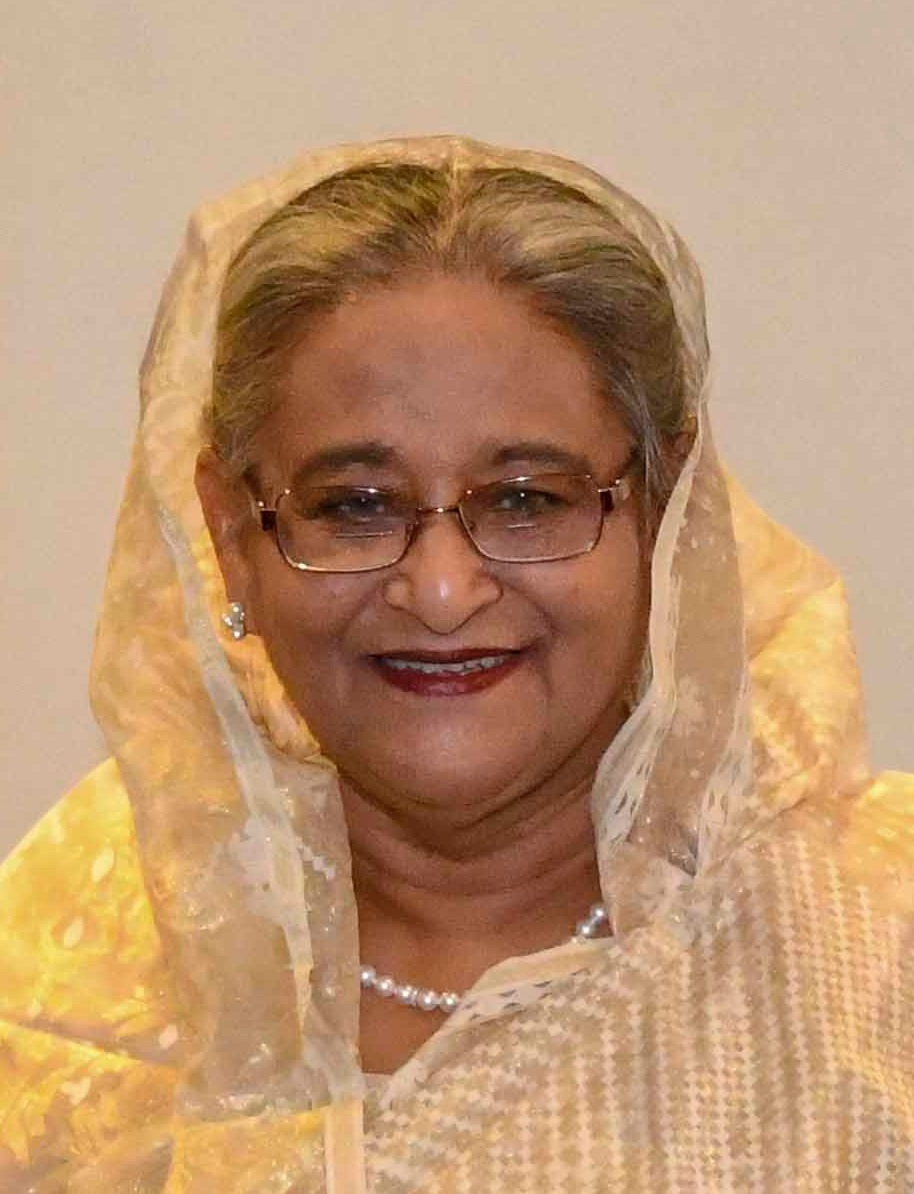
(Bangladesh) Bangladesh
Sheikh Hasina,
Prime Minister

(Haiti) Haiti
Jovenel Moïse,
President and Chair of CARICOM

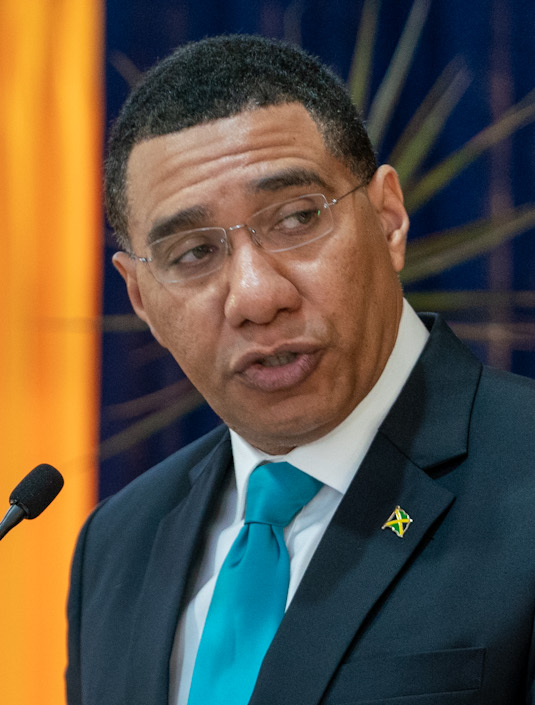
(Jamaica) Jamaica
Andrew Holness,
Prime Minister

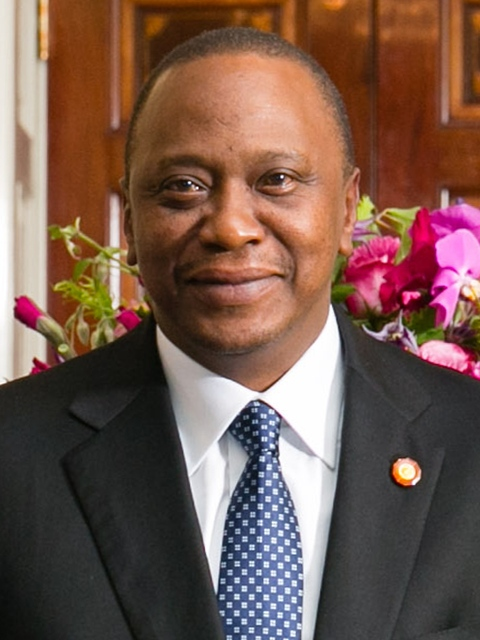
(Kenya) Kenya
Uhuru Kenyatta,
President

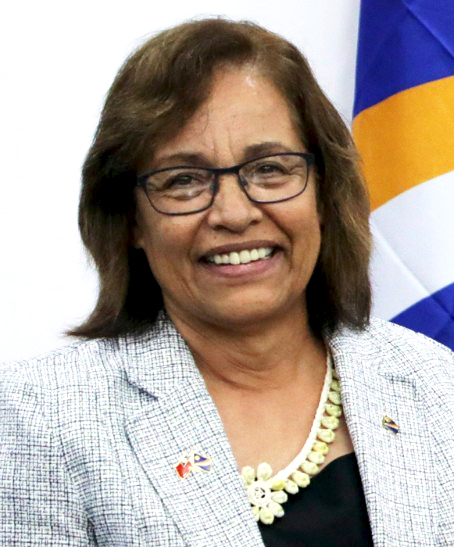
(Marshall Islands) Marshall Islands
Hilda Heine,
President

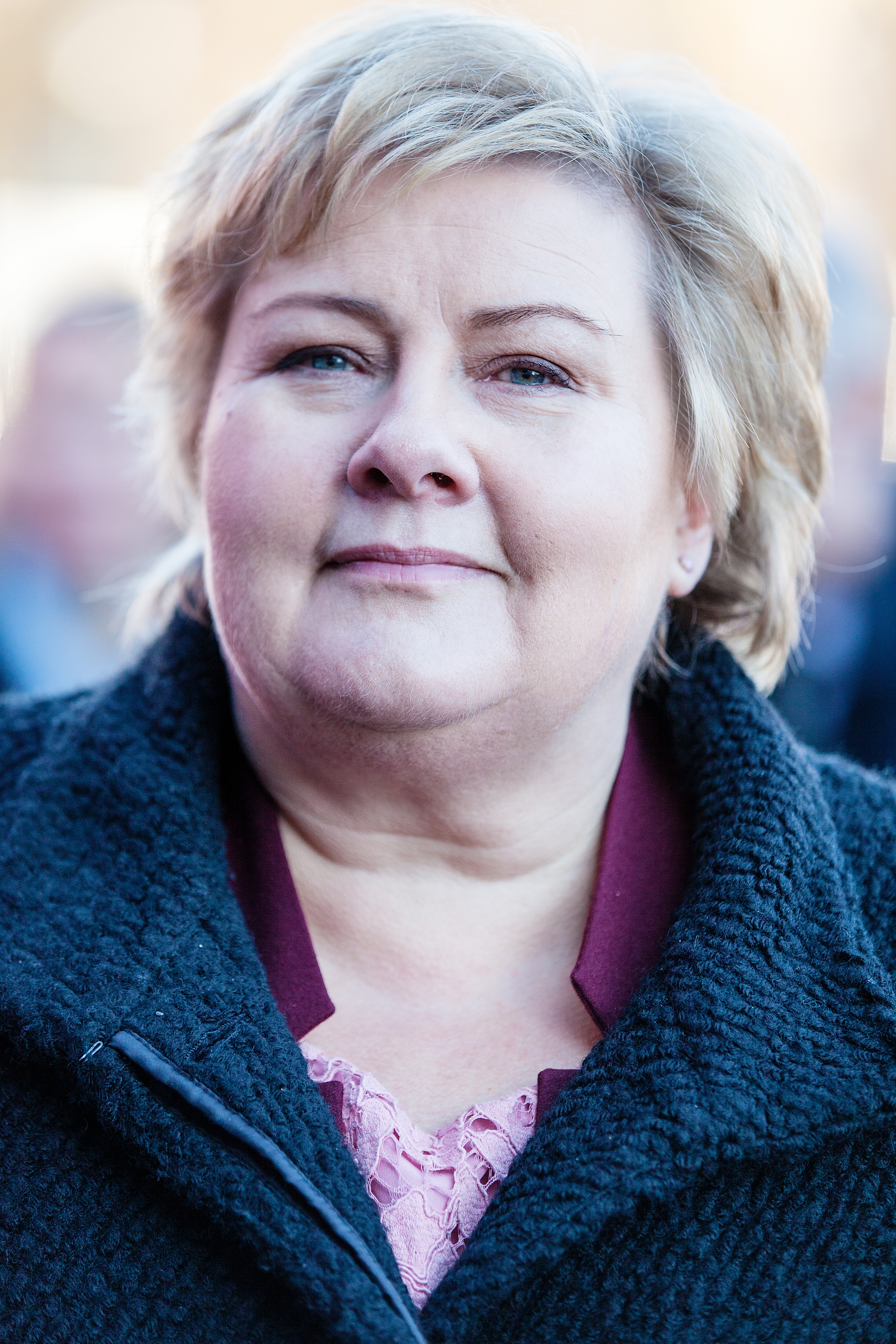
(Norway) Norway
Erna Solberg,
Prime Minister

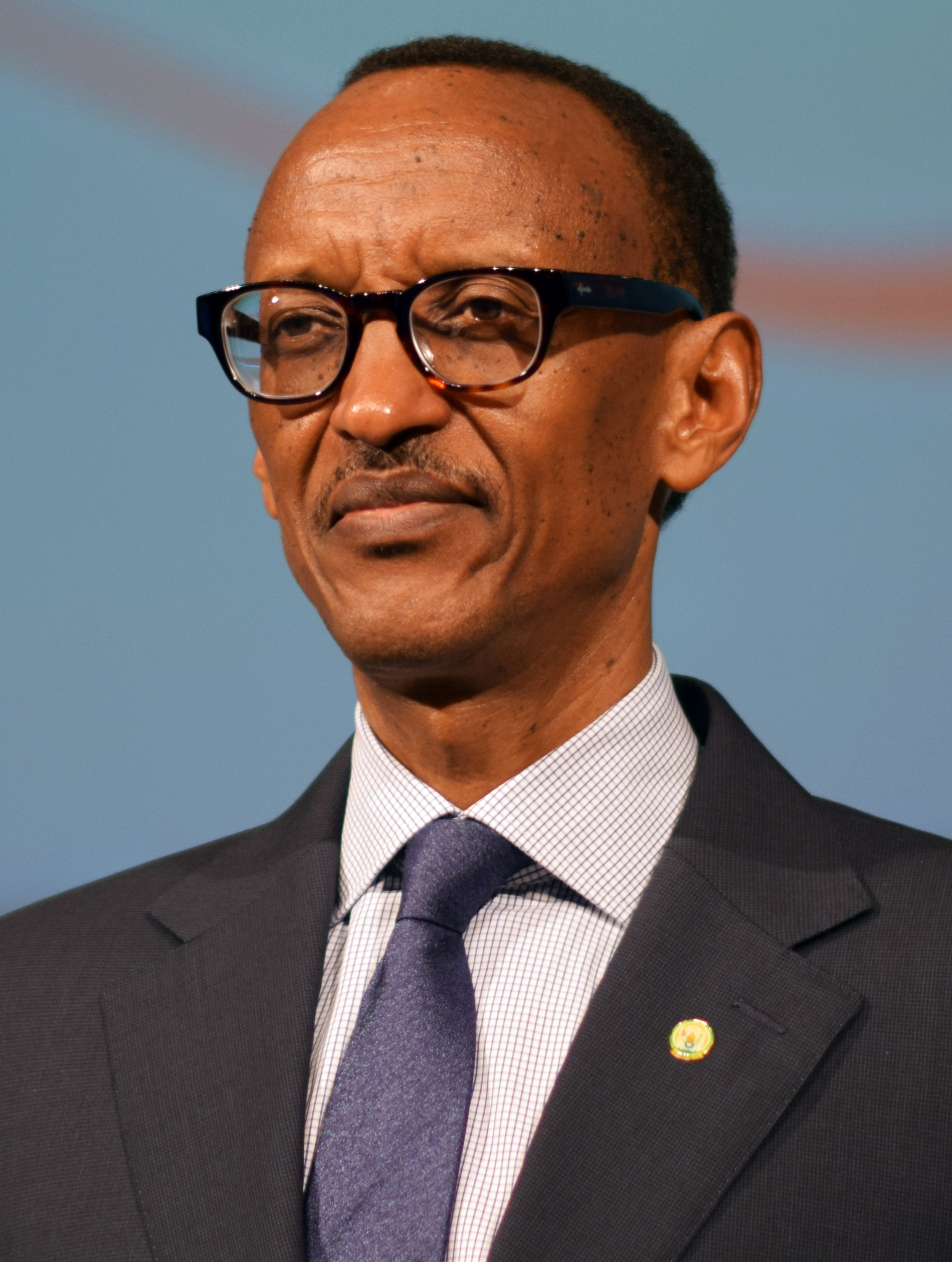
(Rwanda) Rwanda
Paul Kagame,
President and Chair of the African Union

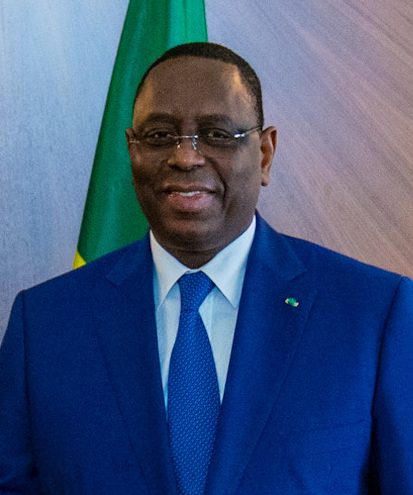
(Senegal) Senegal
Macky Sall,
President

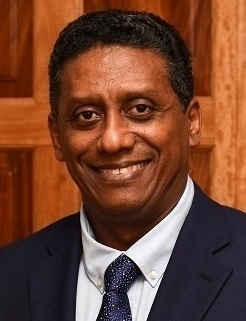
(Seychelles) Seychelles
Danny Faure,
President

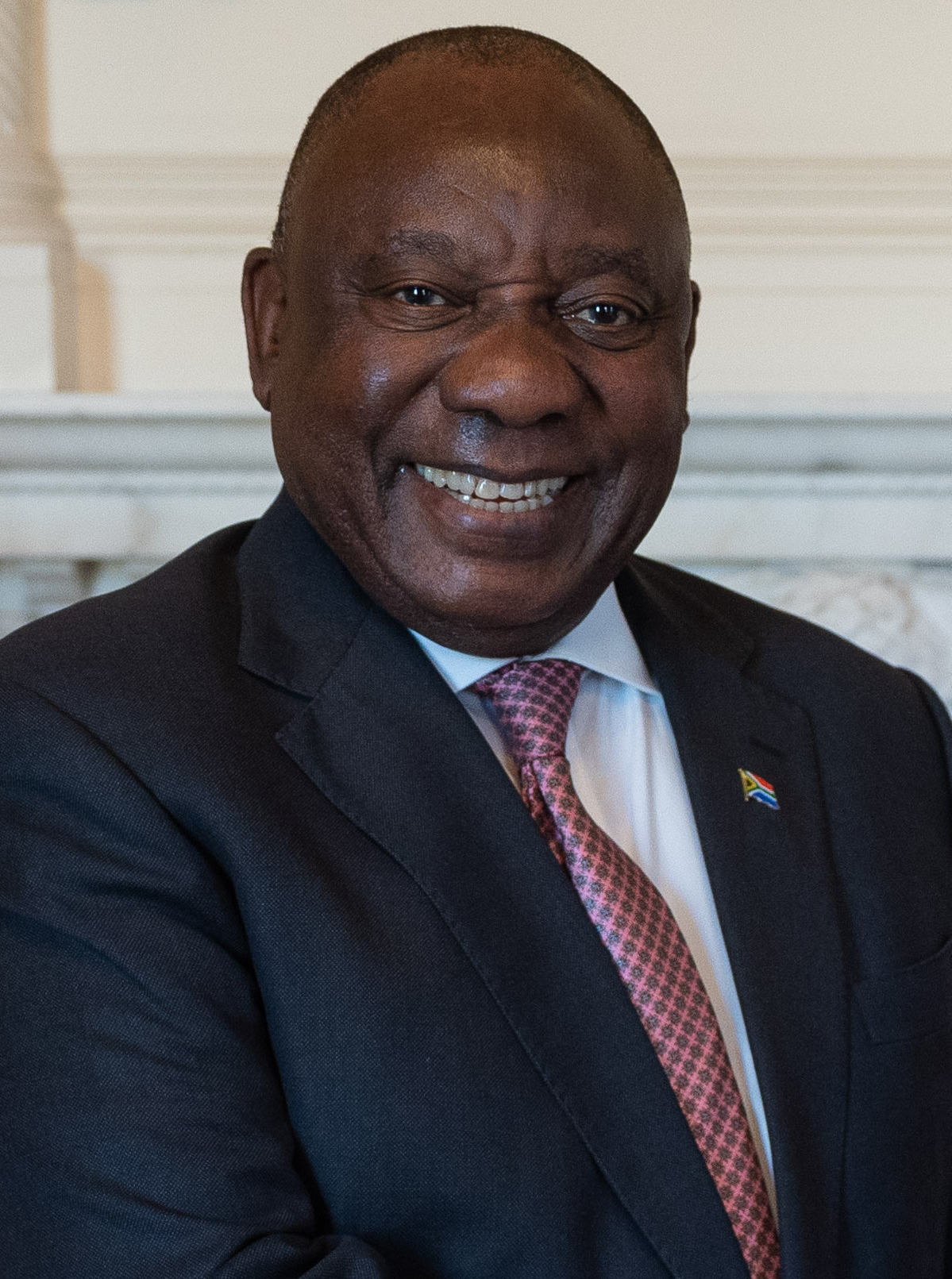
(South Africa) South Africa
Cyril Ramaphosa,
President

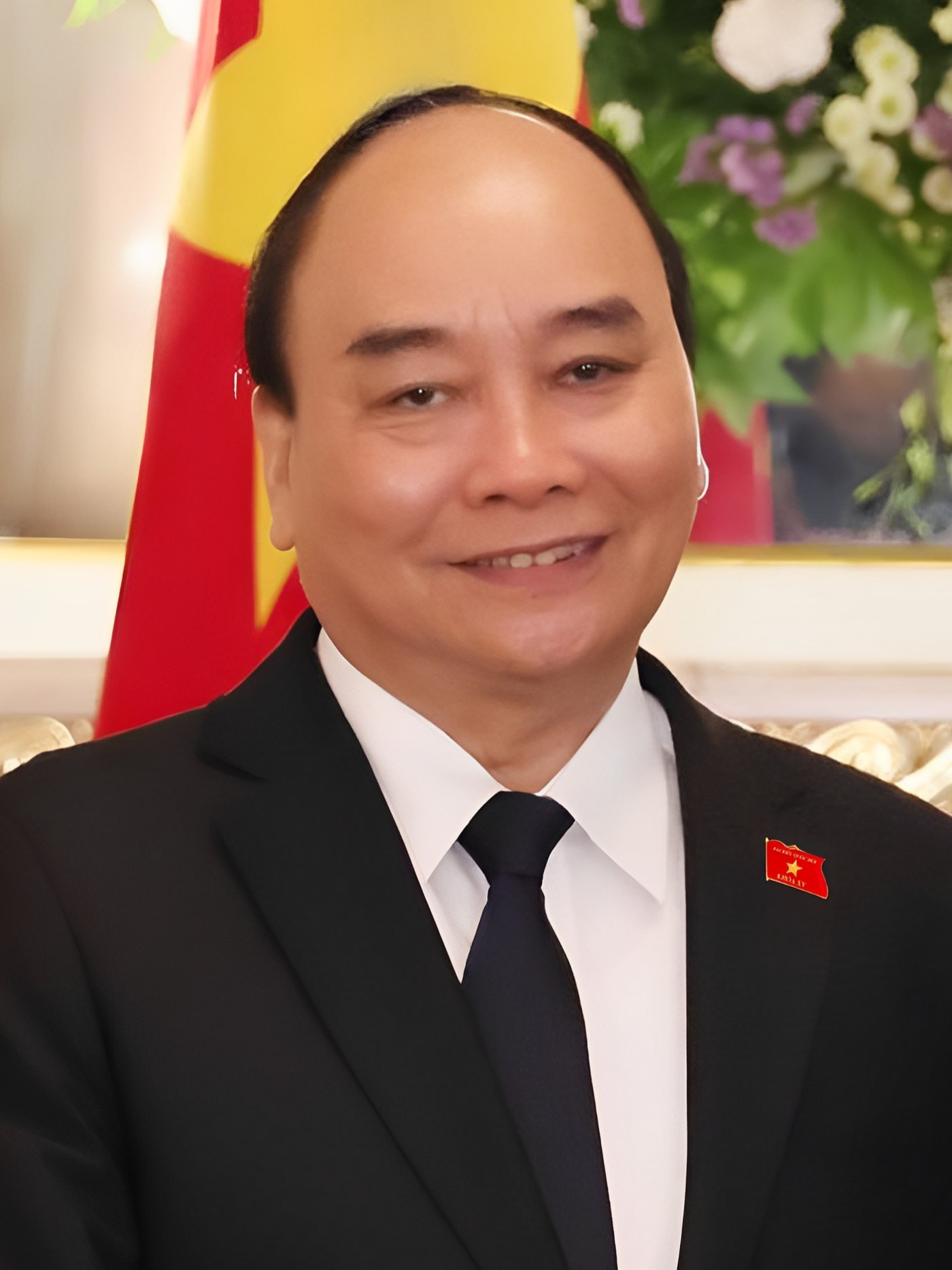
(Vietnam) Vietnam
Nguyễn Xuân Phúc,
Prime Minister

==== Heads of international organizations ====
The following heads of international organizations were invited to the Outreach Session of the G7 Summit.

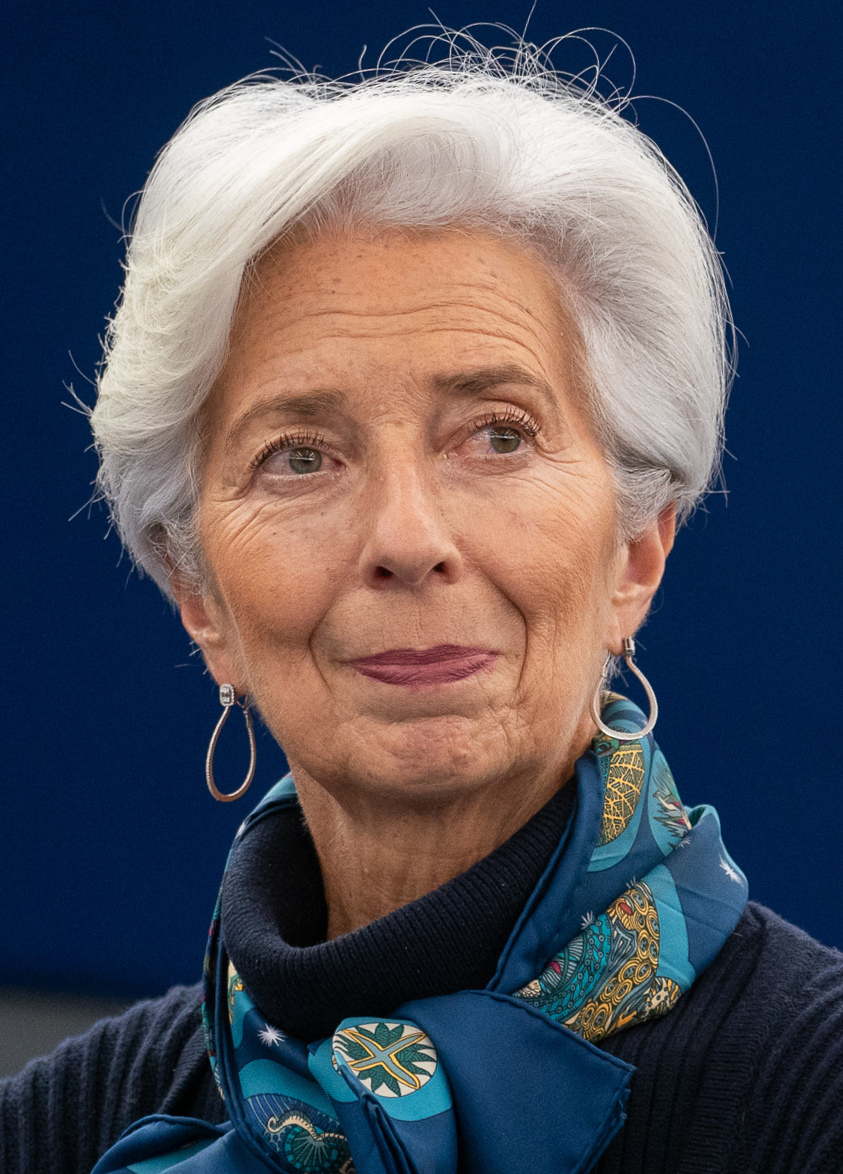
International Monetary Fund
Christine Lagarde,
managing director

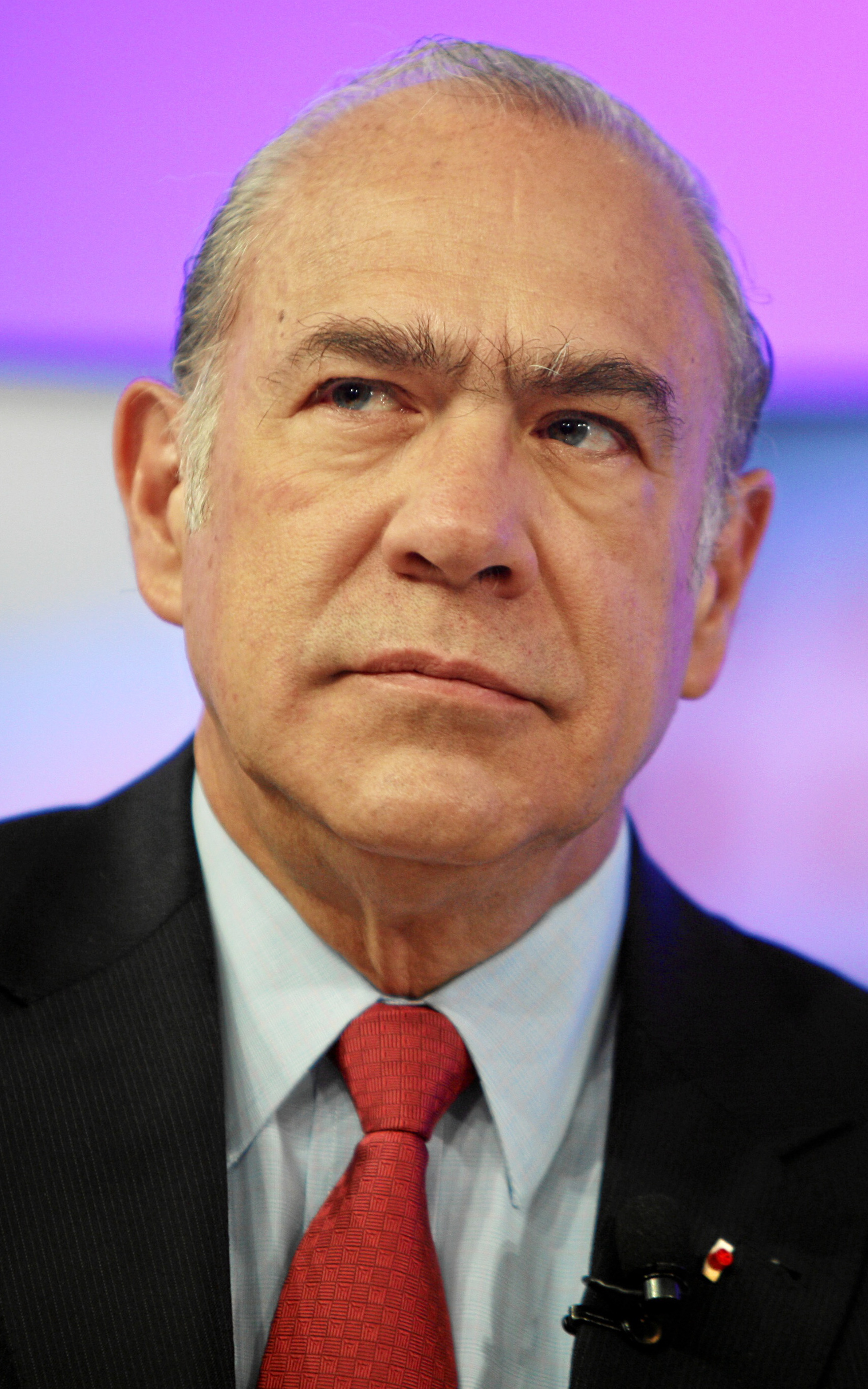
OECD
José Ángel Gurría,
Secretary-General

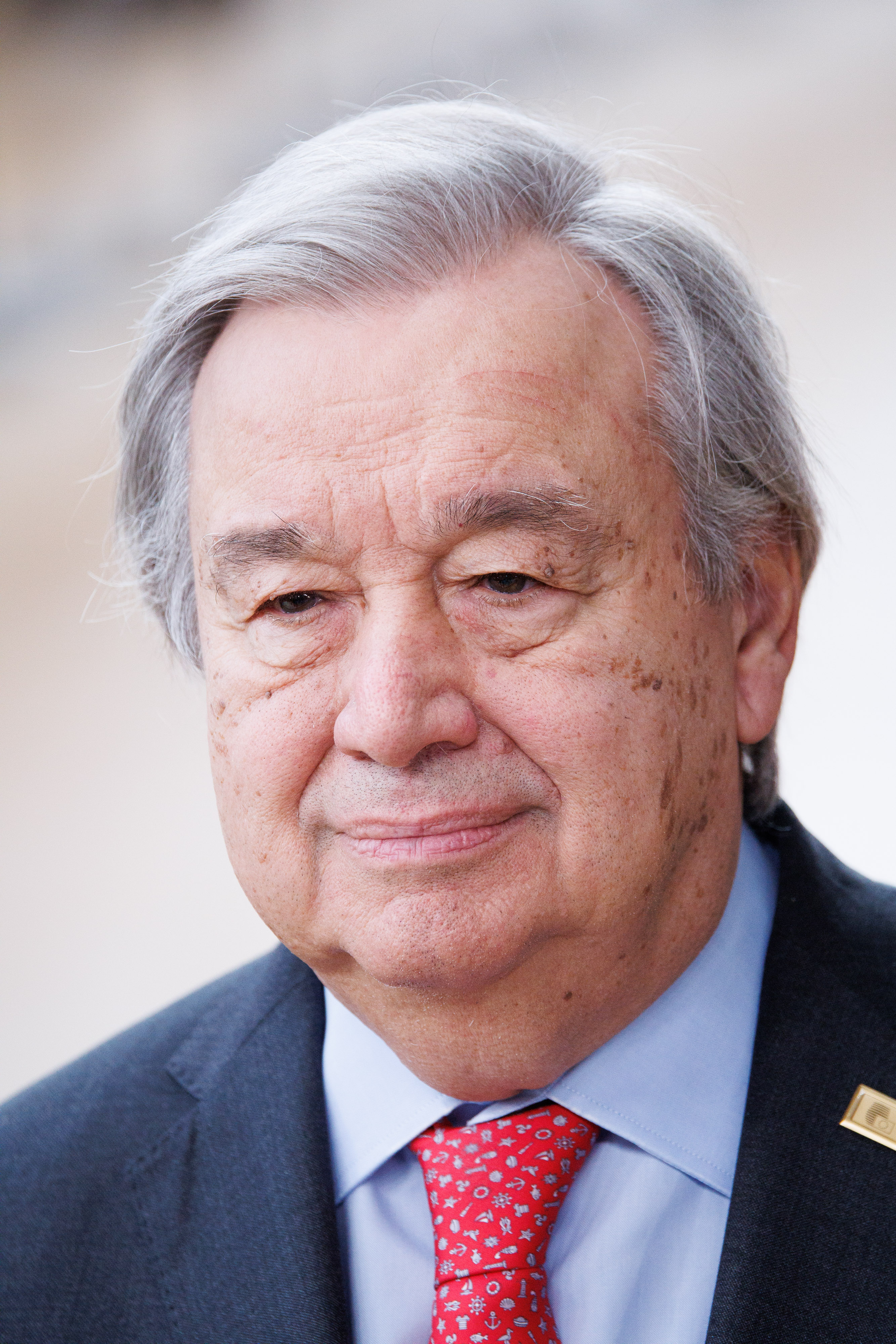
United Nations
António Guterres,
Secretary-General

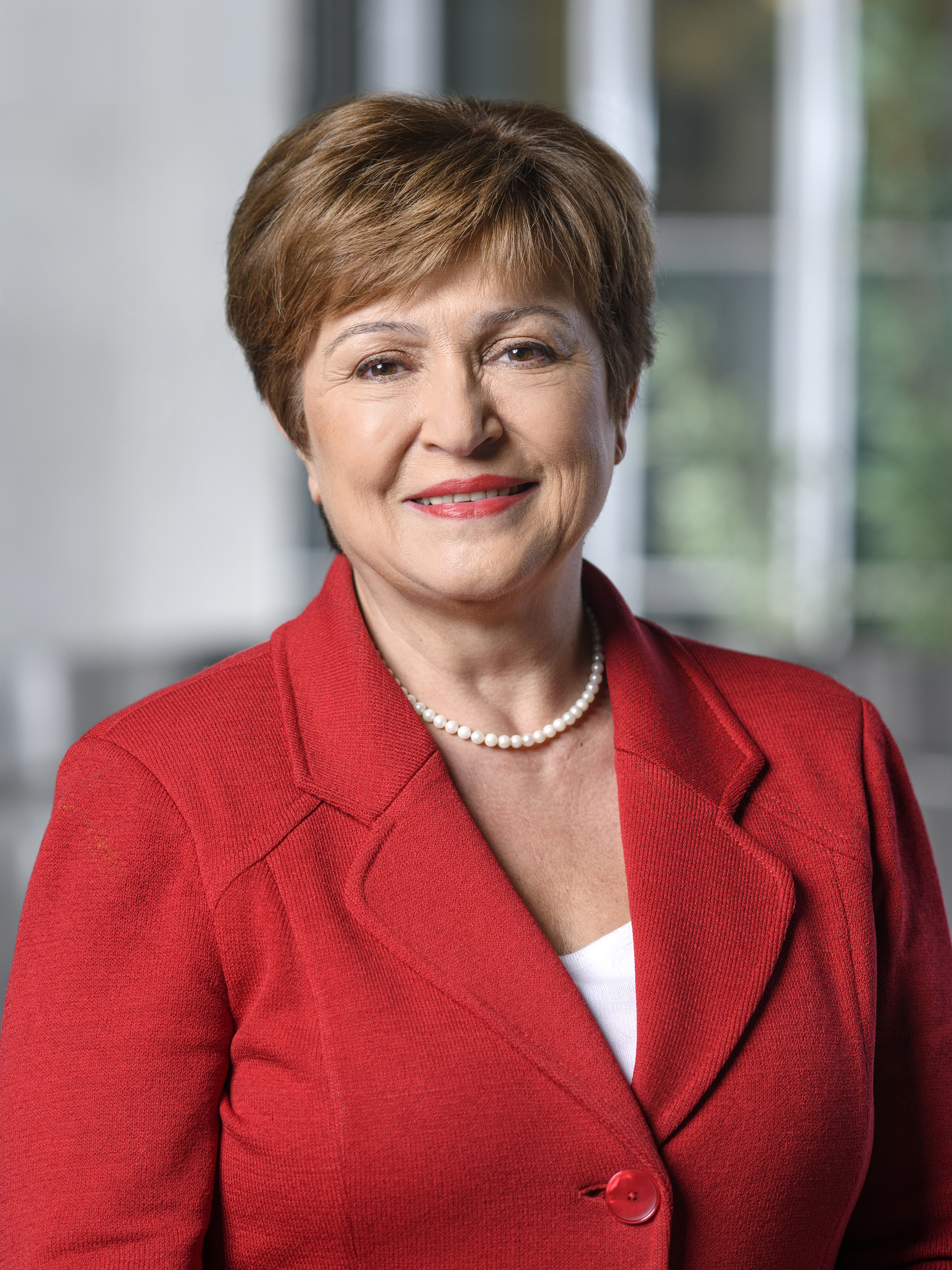
World Bank
Kristalina Georgieva,
CEO

== Dispute with Donald Trump ==
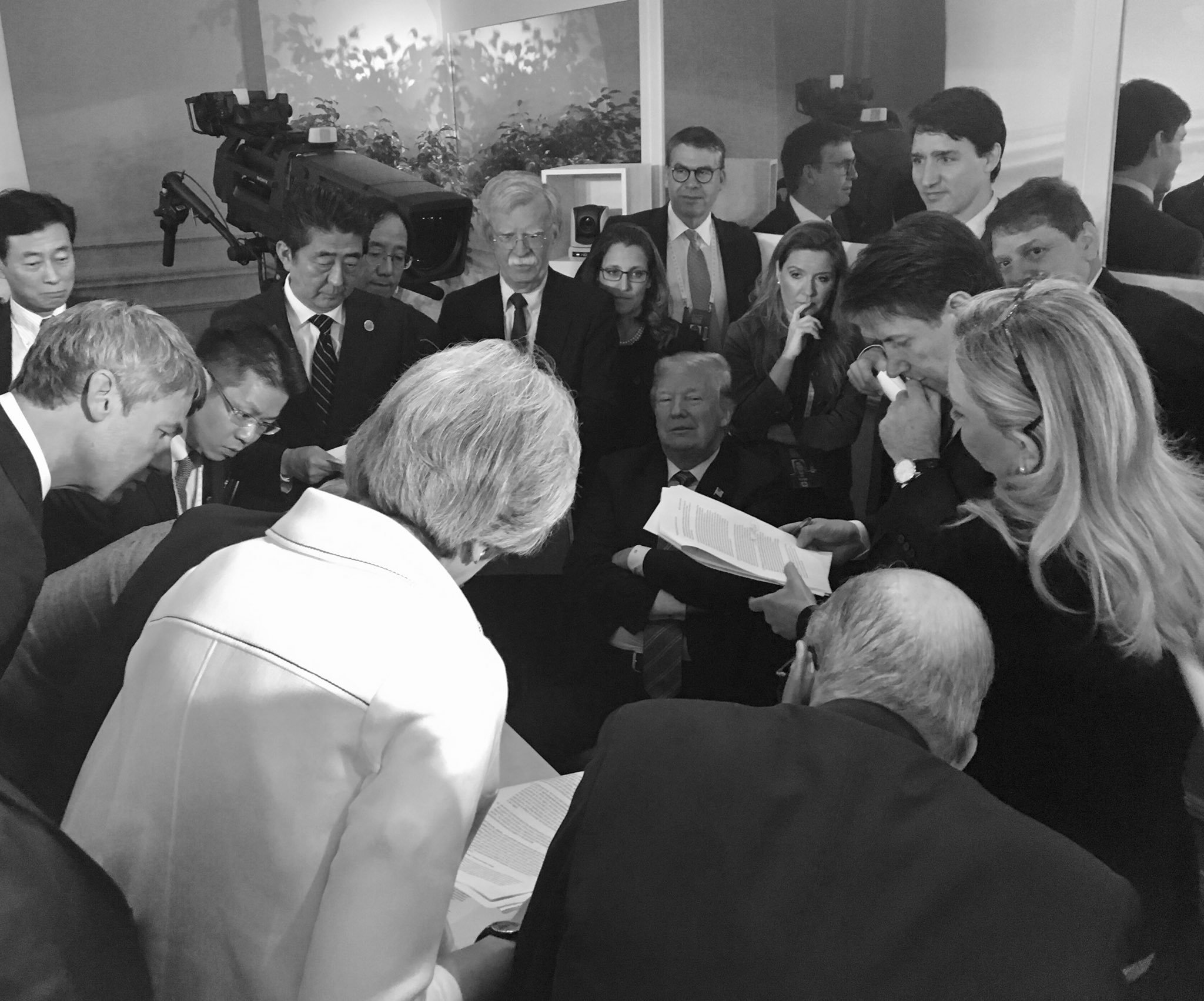
Negotiations with Trump and other G7 leaders

=== Background ===
The summit was dubbed the "G6+1" by the government of France and political commentators. This resulted from the United States withdrawing from the Joint Comprehensive Plan of Action and from the Paris Agreement, American tariffs, and trade-related disputes between Trump and French President Emmanuel Macron and Trudeau.

=== Comments by Donald Trump to Shinzo Abe ===
Trump insulted Japanese Prime Minister Shinzo Abe. He stated he would send 25 million ethnic Mexicans to Japan, saying that "you don't have this problem, but I can send you 25 million Mexicans and you'll be out of office very soon".

=== Comments by Donald Trump on Justin Trudeau ===
Trump left the summit early to travel to Singapore for the United States' first summit with North Korean leader Kim Jong-un. On 9 June 2018, he tweeted that he had instructed the representatives of the United States not to endorse the communique and criticized Justin Trudeau's statements at a news conference following the meeting, calling him "meek and mild" and "dishonest and weak".

=== Comments by Peter Navarro ===
Trump advisor Peter Navarro spoke harshly negative words about Trudeau, saying that there is "a special place in Hell" for him. He later apologized for the language, but stood behind his statement.

== Analysis ==
The response of the United States at the G7 received condemnation from foreign policy experts, political scientists, and former diplomats.

Foreign policy expert Ian Bremmer called the summit the "geopolitical equivalent of the Comey firing" and said that it would "really damage...important long-term relationship[s]".

Political scientist Brian Klaas stated: "By attacking allies while championing Russia, Trump made the G-7 summit a disaster—but he fulfilled Vladimir Putin's biggest fantasy. An absolute disgrace."

Former United States Deputy Secretary of State Strobe Talbott wrote: "[Trump] is the democratic world's worst nightmare. He has crippled NATO, the North Atlantic community, the European Union and now the G-7. In Putin's zero-sum worldview, that is a dream come true."

== Merkel-Trump stare down photo ==
On 9 June, Angela Merkel posted a photo of the second day of the G7 meeting on her Instagram account; the caption saying "Day two of the G7 summit in Canada: spontaneous meeting between two working sessions". The image shows Merkel with her hands pressed on the table staring down at Trump, who in turn is staring back while sitting with his arms crossed. The image also showed Abe, John Bolton, May, and Macron surrounding the two leaders, although Abe's "look of uncertainty" was notably singled out. The image was taken by German photographer Jesco Denzel. The photo quickly became viral.

Some observers described the image as something out of a classical painting, with some Twitter users even parodying the image into a painting. Others used the image as an example to describe the tense G7 meeting, especially with regards to Trump. Similarly, Macron, Trump, Trudeau, Conte, and Abe also released their own photos (through their Twitter accounts or their photographers') of the G7 meeting in the same room but taken at different angles and moments. Trump commented on the viral image, stating that the photo was taken during a discussion that was "unrelated to anything". He further stated that while the image may seem unfriendly, everyone present were "simply talking".
