= Raymond Malenfant =

Canadian businessman (1930–2022)

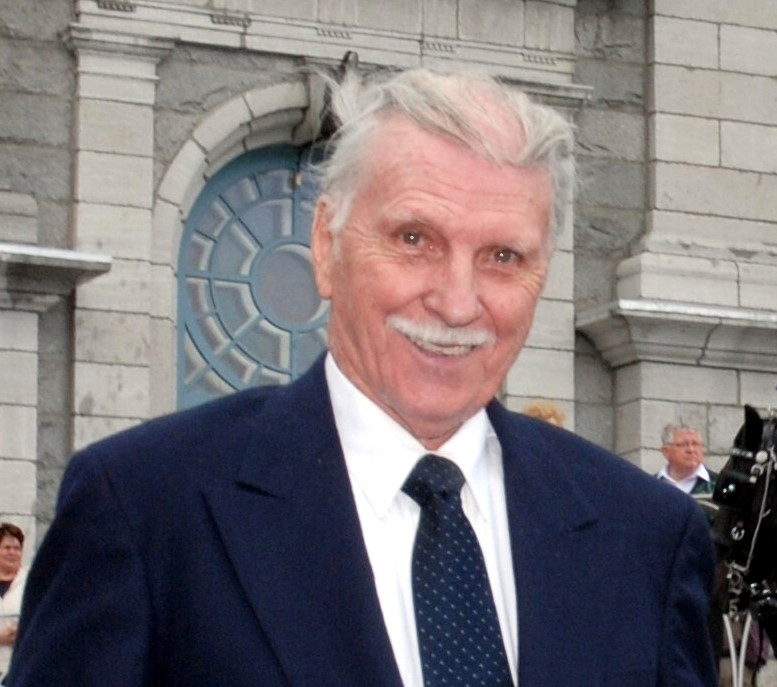
- Malenfant in 2010
- Born: 6 October 1930; Saint-Hubert-de-Rivière-du-Loup, Quebec, Canada
- Died: 7 January 2022 (aged 91); Montreal, Quebec, Canada
- Occupation: Businessman

Raymond Malenfant (6 October 1930 – 7 January 2022) was a Canadian businessman.

== Biography ==
He found most of his success in the hotel business, reaching his peak in the late 1980s with a fortune of approximately $400 million.

He was known for his leadership of the Universal chain, composed of nine hotels, six office towers, multiple conference rooms, and a ski center. He was the owner of the Manoir Richelieu in Charlevoix and the Fort Garry Hotel in Winnipeg.

Malenfant died on 7 January 2022, at the age of 91.
