= John Nairne =

Scottish-Canadian soldier and seigneur (1731–1802)

John Nairne

Lieutenant-Colonel John Nairne (1 March 1731 – 14 July 1802) was a Scottish-Canadian soldier and seigneur. Nairne came to Canada in 1758 as a lieutenant, and participated in the captures of Louisbourg and Quebec City. Given Nairne's lack of prospects back in Scotland, he decided to remain in Canada, and in 1762 he received, along with his friend Malcolm Fraser, the seigneury of La Malbaie, with Fraser taking Mount Murray and Nairne receiving Murray Bay and a section of Charlevoix, Quebec. Nairne retired on half-pay as soon as he received his land as was common practice amongst British officers and soldiers at the time.

Devoting himself to his seigneury, Nairne had it surveyed, and brought some soldiers from the regiment with him to settle the land. Nairne, hoping to establish a Protestant settlement on his lands, found it impossible to procure a Protestant minister for the settlement, having none but a few Protestant adherents living on his seigneury. Although Nairne happened to be an excellent farmer, it was difficult to turn a profit off the land he had acquired and many of his requests for funding (such as asking for a road to be built) were left unanswered.

In 1769, Nairne married a fellow Scot by the name of Christina Emery. With Christina, Nairne had four children, but by the time Nairne returned from a 1773 trip to Scotland, three of them had died. Eventually, he would have five more children with Christina Nairne, building a large manor house for his family and continuing his work in the settlement.

In 1775, with an American invasion imminent, Governor Guy Carleton charged Nairne with organizing a regiment from his seigneury and the surrounding communities. On August the 12th of 1775, Nairne offered himself for any available Captaincy. He was appointed as Captain in the Royal Highland Emigrants in the following month of September,1775. The group was largely composed of soldiers from Nairne's former regiment, the 78th Regiment of Foot. Nairne played a key role fighting for the Loyalist side during the Siege of Quebec.

Nairne's role as Captain was to last just eight years. He served with distinction and eventually reached the rank of Lieutenant-Colonel in the British army. During his military career, Nairne fought at Montreal, Quebec and Île aux Noix, a small island located on the Richelieu River, near to Lake Champlain. He would also supervise the building of Fort Haldimand on Carleton Island which was occupied during the American Revolution. The ruins of this fort still exist today and can be visited. They are located in the town of Cape Vincent on Carleton Island.

He also supervised the building of a jail in |Murray Bay]]. Finally, in 1783, after his promotion to Lieutenant-Colonel, he sold his rank in the Royal Highland Emigrants receiving £3000 for it. In contemporary monetary value, his rank as Lieutenant-Colonel in the British army was worth approximately £573,749.79 (2022) or CDN$912,015.45 (2022). Given that this value is being affected by the current global pandemic (2022), consideration should be given to that amount paid while keeping in mind the pros and cons of an economy impacted by war. Following that sale, Nairne returned to Murray Bay where he settled permanently and lived well for the remainder of his life.

At the time of Nairne's death in 1802, his seigneury had more than 500 inhabitants and was prospering economically. Nairne had little to regret, although he deeply wished that his attempts to implant Protestantism had been successful. Still, he was on good terms with the Roman Catholic priest.

Of all the things Nairne had seen in his lifetime, his deepest source of sadness was the sudden death of his son, John, in India. Although Nairne had had many children, only one of his sons actually survived him. Thomas Nairne, borne of military tradition, would follow in his father's foot steps and join the British military. Then, in 1813, just 11 years after his own father's death, Tom was killed in battle. He would die, oddly enough, fighting at the fort his father had helped to build all those years earlier, at Carleton Island.
