= Laure Conan =

French-Canadian novelist (1845–1924)

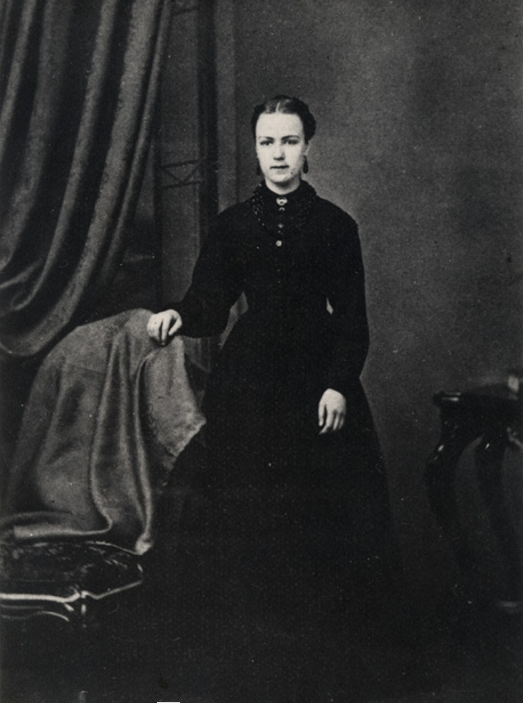
- Laure Conan, c. 1870
- Born: Marie-Louise-Félicité Angers; 9 January 1845; La Malbaie, Province of Canada, British Empire
- Died: 6 June 1924 (aged 79); Quebec City, Quebec, Canada
- Occupation: novelist
- Writing career
- Pen name: Laure Conan
- Genres: intimism, psychological fiction, historical biography
- Notable awards: Ordre des Palmes Académiques (1898), Montyon Prize (1903)

Marie-Louise-Félicité Angers (9 January 1845 – 6 June 1924), better known by her pen name Laure Conan, was a French Canadian writer and journalist. She is regarded as one of the first French-Canadian female novelists and the writer of the first French Canadian psychological novel.

She was born in La Malbaie, Quebec, and educated by the Ursulines in Quebec City. She returned to La Malbaie and dated Pierre-Alexis Tremblay, but their relationship ended; critics ascribe the end of this relationship as the reason why Conan's writings include themes of isolation. Her first publication was "Un amour vrai" in the Revue de Montréal, a short story. For this publication, she chose the Laure Conan alias, named for Conan III, Duke of Brittany. She published Angéline de Montbrun in segments from 1881 to 1882 and as a complete novel in 1884, considered the first French Canadian psychological novel. She published À l'œuvre et à l'épreuve about the early years of Montreal in 1900, which won the Montyon Prize in 1903. Conan then focused on writing historical biographies, mostly concerning religious figures. She published 195 biographies in various Quebec periodicals. She returned to intimism fictional works and published L'obscure souffrance in 1915. She died in Quebec City, Quebec, from heart failure following surgery to treat ovarian cancer, and was buried next to Tremblay.

Conan's writings explore themes of family, nation, and religion. She often creates allegories to the French-Canadian conflict of identity caused by the British conquest of New France and the deterioration of French-Canadian culture. Her writing often quoted other literature including fiction, the Bible and poems.

== Early life and education ==
Conan was born in La Malbaie, Quebec, on 9 January 1845. Her father was Élie Angers, a blacksmith, and Marie Perron. Her parents had twelve children, but only six survived into adulthood. Her family operated a general store and the post office in La Malbaie. Conan received higher education with the Ursulines of Quebec in Quebec City from 1859 to 1862, where she learned English and German. She received recognition from the convent for her writing skills and was one of five students accepted into a higher class level for writing. Her work was published in the cahier d'honneur of Papillon Littéraire.

== Return to La Malbaie ==
After completing her education in 1862, Conan returned to La Malbaie. She dated Pierre-Alexis Tremblay for a couple of years, but the relationship ended sometime between 1867 and 1870, the year in which Pierre-Alexis married Mary Ellen Connolly. Some researchers ascribe Tremblay's vow of chastity as the reason why the relationship ended. In March 1871, Conan had a vision of receiving absolution after the blood of Jesus was applied to her.

In 1877, Conan went to Sisters Adorers of the Precious Blood and met two women to whom she would frequently write letters. In 1879, her brother arranged meetings of writers in La Malbaie, of which Conan would attend.

== Publishing career ==
In 1878, Conan published a short story called "Un amour vrai" in the Revue de Montréal. She chose the pen name Laure Conan after Conan III, Duke of Brittany, whom she read about in Zénaïde Fleuriot's novels. The Revue canadienne (Montreal) published Angéline de Montbrun from June 1881 to August 1882, the first of 38 pieces of writing the periodical would publish between 1881 and 1919. The success of Angéline de Montbrun caused her to want to publish this as a novel and sought out Henri-Raymond Casgrain as her patron. Casgrain promoted Angéline de Montbrun in the Quebec newspaper Le Courrier du Canada, convinced Léger Brosseau to publish the book, wrote the preface to the book, and convinced colleagues to write reviews for the book. Conan refused Casgrain's offer to publish her real name in the preface, stating that she did not want the two names to be associated with each other. This caused a rift between the two and they ceased communication until shortly before Casgrain's death.

Conan went to Europe in 1884 to visit various French writers. Critics of intimism literature were encouraged to reveal the identities of authors writing under pseudonyms, so Conan decided to write other types of fiction and sought out new publishers of her work. In 1886, she published a play called Si les Canadiennes le voulaient!. Her novel, À l'œuvre et à l'épreuve, was published in Quebec in 1891 and in Paris two years later. The novel was cited in Conan being awarded the Ordre des Palmes Académiques in 1898.

Conan struggled to receive the full royalties from the Paris printer that published À l'œuvre et à l'épreuve. Printers in Montreal printed pirated copies of "Un amour vrai", retitled "Larmes d'amour", in 1897. Conan sued the publishers for damages but lost the court case. In 1900, she wrote "Nos établissements d'éducation" in Women of Canada: their life and work. She also published L'oublié, a novel concerning the first years of Montreal, which won the Montyon Prize in 1903. In 1907, she adopted the novel into a play entitled Aux jours de Maisonneuve.

== Journalism career ==
After 1890, Conan embarked on a journalism career, focusing on publishing her religious beliefs in editorials. She moved to Saint-Hyacinthe and edited a periodical called La Voix du Précieux Sang. She wrote 90 articles for the periodical, mostly biographies concerning religious people, and these were published together in 1913 as Physionomies de saints. Between 1896–1897 and 1903–1906, she published an additional 20 religious biographies in a periodical called Le Rosaire et les autres dévotions dominicaines, and they were published in a volume called Silhouettes canadiennes in 1917. From 1902 to 1907, she wrote essays in Le Journal de Françoise, a magazine published in Montreal. In total, she wrote 195 articles to various Quebec periodicals.

== Later works and death ==
Conan returned to writing intimism works by publishing L'obscure souffrance in the Revue canadienne in 1915 and later publishing it as a novel in 1919. Conan was spending more time living with the institute of the Little Daughters of St Joseph in Montreal, and in 1920 she sold her possessions at auction and left her family home in La Malbaie. In 1921 she published La vaine foi and produced Aux jours de Maisonneuve in its first stage production.

On 20 May 1924, she submitted a novel for a literary prize, and six days later was diagnosed with ovarian cancer. She died on 6 June of heart failure while she was being operated on. The novel she submitted was published in March 1925 as La sève immortelle. She was buried in La Malbaie, in a plot next to Pierre-Alexis Tremblay.

== Writing style ==
When critiquing her essays in cahier d'honneur, George-Louis Le Moine, the director of Papillon Littéraire, said her work was amongst his favourite, but criticised the writing as stiff and said it lacked punctuation. Manon Brunet, professor of French at Université du Québec à Trois-Rivières, said this early work featured historical and religious themes that would continue to be explored in future work and that her work described the characters' actions with "intimate detail".

Critics referred to her writing in her first novel, Angéline de Montbrun, as pious, while modern-day critics are split on the depiction of psychological effects on the characters. She was skilled in reciting other literature, poems, Bible verses, and other Christian religious texts, and often incorporated passages from these sources in her work. Critics would state that she referenced other works too often. Her later works of L'obscure souffrance and La vaine foi were written in an intimism style and formatted as a collection of thoughts expressed by a woman affected by crises of existentialism, romantic, and religious natures. Brunet stated that the writing in these later works was more mature than in Angéline de Montbrun.

Conan was influenced by the literary trend of historical novels and wrote three herself: A l'oeuvre et à l'épreuve, L'Oublié and La Sève immortelle.

== Themes ==
Conan's work focused on the concepts of family, nation, and religion. She has been referred to as the first French Canadian female novelist.

Conan remained emotionally attached to Pierre-Alexis Tremblay, the man she dated in the 1860s. References to this relationship appear throughout her writings when she included letters or diary entries in her fictional works. Critics state that themes of isolation and world-weariness described in bitter and fatalistic words were inspired by her reaction to the end of this relationship.

Conan's work explored the French Canadian identity after the conquest of Britain and the failure of the Lower Canada Rebellion. The main character's diary entries are an allegory to an idealized independent Quebec whose culture is thriving. This theme was also explored in Si les Canadiennes le voulaient! when the only male character tries to convince others to inspire patriotism among their male relatives.

Conan often described her female characters' perceptions of their societal and political situation.

== Selected works ==
- Angéline de Montbrun – 1884 (translated as Angéline de Montbrun, 1974)
- À l'oeuvre et à l'épreuve – 1891 (translated as The Master Motive, 1909)
- L'oublié – 1900
- L'obscure souffrance – 1919
- La sève immortelle – 1925
- Oeuvres romanesques (3 volumes) – 1974–75
