= Henri Le Sidaner =

French painter (1862–1939)

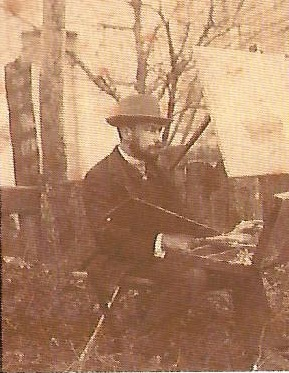
- Photograph of Le Sidaner at Étaples
- Born: Henri Eugène Augustin Le Sidaner; 7 August 1862; Port Louis, British Mauritius
- Died: 14 July 1939 (aged 76); Paris, France
- Education: École nationale supérieure des Beaux-Arts
- Known for: Oil painting, watercolour
- Notable work: La Promenade Des Orphelines (1888), Table Au Clair De Lune (1928), Les Cygnes (1900), Les Marches Du Jardin (1931)
- Movement: Post-Impressionism, Intimism, Symbolism
- Awards: Légion d'honneur – Chevalier (Knight) (1908); Legion d’honneur – Officier (Officer) (1913)

Henri Eugène Augustin Le Sidaner (7 August 1862 – 14 July 1939) was an intimist painter known for his paintings of domestic interiors and quiet street scenes. His style contained elements of impressionism with the influences of Édouard Manet, Monet and of the Pointillists discernible in his work. Le Sidaner favoured a subdued use of colour, preferring nuanced greys and opals applied with uneven, dappled brushstrokes to create atmosphere and mysticism. A skilled nocturne painter, he travelled widely throughout France and Europe before settling at Gerberoy in the Picardy countryside from where he painted for over thirty years.

Le Sidaner's paintings and pastels were widely collected throughout his career. His seductive views of the gardens he created in the ruins of the medieval fortress at Gerberoy, with their recently vacated tables dappled in sunlight and overhung by roses, have cemented his reputation as a unique artist who does not fit easily into an art movement .

== Early years ==
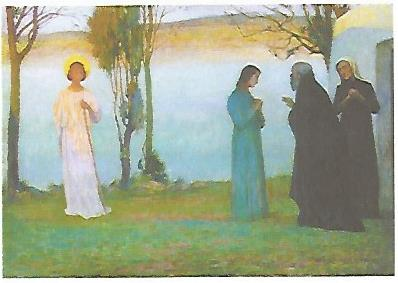
Le Départ De Tobie (1894)

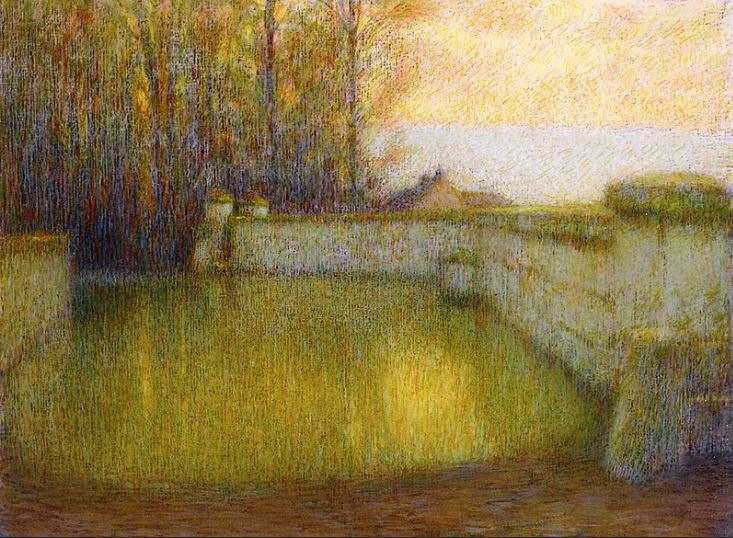
L'Eau morte (1901)

Henri Le Sidaner was born on 7 August 1862 in Port Louis, Mauritius, where his Breton parents Jean Marie (1828–1880) and Amélie Henrietta (née Robberechts) were living. His father Jean Marie was a ship inspector for Lloyd's whose business took the family back to France in 1872 (Note: His father was lost in a storm in the English channel on 15 September 1880 when Le Sidaner was 18 years old) The remainder of his childhood was spent in Dunkerque where he attended the Collège et Lycée Notre Dame des Dunes and where he met and befriended Eugène Chigot who was to become a lifelong friend and supporter. He showed aptitude for painting, in which he was supported by his parents, and attended art classes at the atelier of Alphonse Chigot and with a teacher who had been a pupil of Philippe-Jacques van Bree. Le Sidaner's portfolio was adjudged good enough for the city of Dunkerque to award him a scholarship and in 1880, at the age of eighteen, he moved to Paris and the prestigious École nationale supérieure des Beaux-Arts.

In Paris he studied under Alexandre Cabanel, one of the most influential teachers of Belle Époque French painting. Although Cabanel mainly painted in an academic style, that were dismissed derisively as L'art pompier (literally ‘Fireman art’) by some critics, he possessed a deep knowledge of nineteenth century French art, in particular of En plein air painting (Note: ‘En plein air’ painting, a theory credited to Pierre-Henri de Valenciennes (1750–1819) that he expounded in a treatise entitled Reflections and Advice to a Student on Painting, Particularly on Landscape (1800)) and the naturalism of the Barbizon School. According to his biographer Le Sidaner saw Manet's final exhibits at the Paris Salon and was deeply reflective at what he saw in the modernist Manet's work. The result was that Le Sidaner resigned from Cabanel's school, on the grounds of artistic differences. Le Sidaner's interests in the use of colour, softness of form and in painting in the gloaming light were formed during this period as he sought an artistic cure in naturalism and En plein air painting.

== The Colonie artistique d'Étaples ==
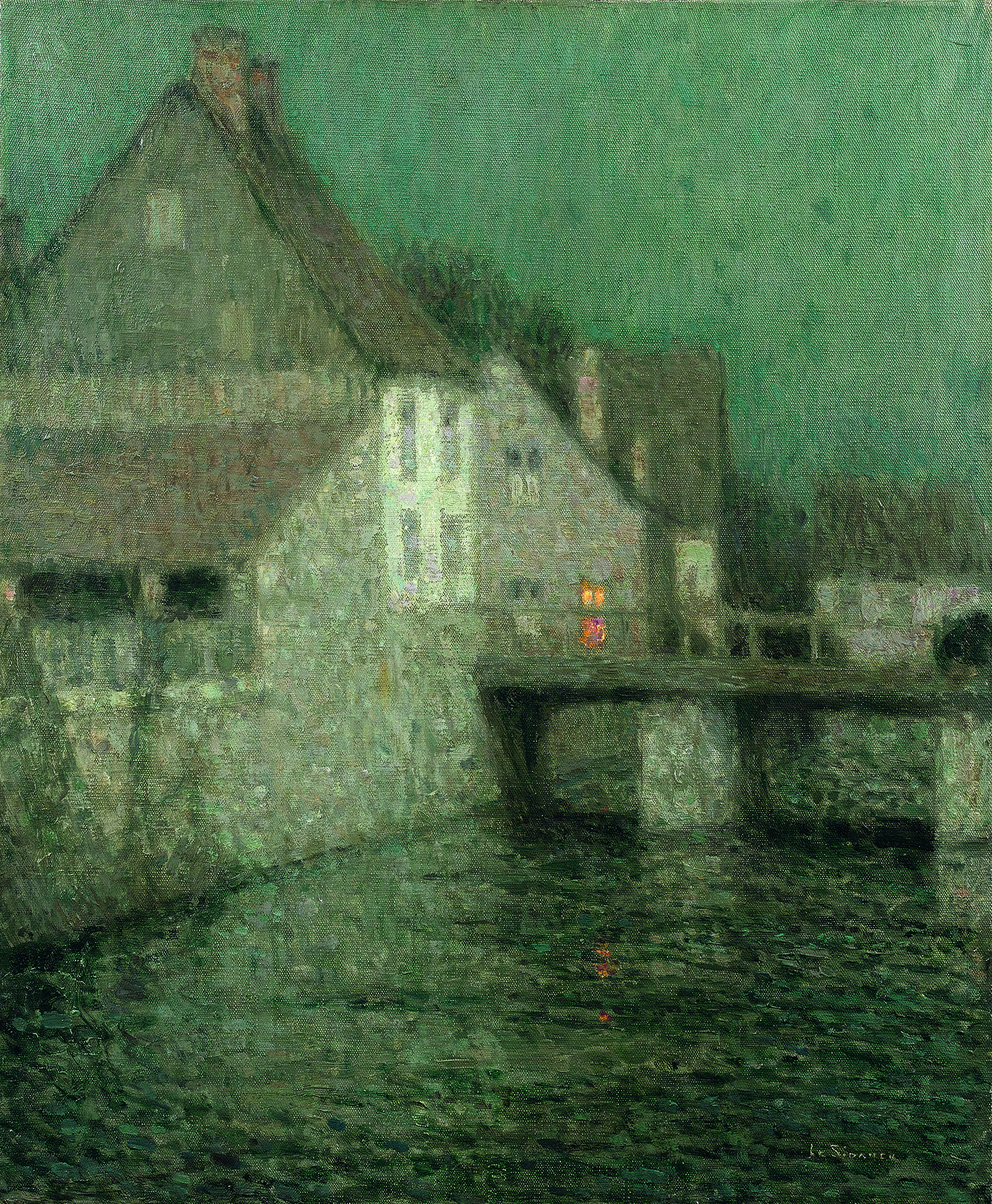

In 1883 he returned to the Côte d'Opale where he joined fellow artist Eugène Chigot at Étaples to established an artists’ workshop and regular exhibitions that would eventually develop into a school of art, called the Villa des Roses. Étaples had a tradition of en plain air painting established by Charles-François Daubigny (1817–1878), who retreated there from the outbreak of the Paris Commune in 1871 and of the local Deauville painter Eugène Boudin (1824–1898), a leading post impressionist. In the late nineteenth- century numerous artists were drawn by the sand dunes, the atmospheric light and the remnants of an older France. In particular artists from the United States, Australia and the British Isles settled around Étaples in a loose collective. Most left at the outset of Great War in 1914 as Flanders became part of the Western Front. Le Sidaner stayed at Étaples for twelve years preferring to work in isolation. In the meantime a febrile debate into the meaning of art was gathering apace in Paris. The Société des Artistes Indépendants was founded in 1884 whilst movements such as Pointillism with their exuberant use of colour were undermining the foundations of academicism. Against this background in 1887 Le Sidaner sent his first painting to the Paris Salon followed in 1888 by La Promenade des Orphelines one of his most celebrated early works. La Benediction De La Mer exhibited in 1890 was awarded with a third place medal and a travel stipend to visit Rome where Le Sidaner made surviving copies of works by Giotto and Fra Angelico. La Benediction De La Mer is a painting with distinctly religious undertones. It is nostalgic and sentimental and the scene is set against an ethereal, atmospheric sky. Le Sidaner became close friends with the Norwegian landscape artist Frits Thaulow and they travelled to The Netherlands in 1891, a visit that produced a number of paintings including Jong meisje in de duinen (Young Woman in the Dunes)(1891) and Fillette au jardin (1894), an intimist painting of Thaulow's daughter unusual for the brightness of the colours that Le Sidaner choose for the little girl.

Le Sidaner's landscape paintings of the period reveal a fascination with the effect of light changes on the sensibilities, particularly at dusk. Whilst the impressionists and the pointillists favoured the use of bright colour to express emotion Le Sidaner began working in tonal, pastel colours and used a lighter palette to create moonlight landscapes. The theme had been explored by Jean-Charles Cazin (1840 - 1901), an older artist also from the Pas-de-calais, who became known for his views of uninhabited streets, often illuminated by a single light coming from a window. Le Sidaner used the same motif many times in the course of his career.

== The inspiration of Bruges ==
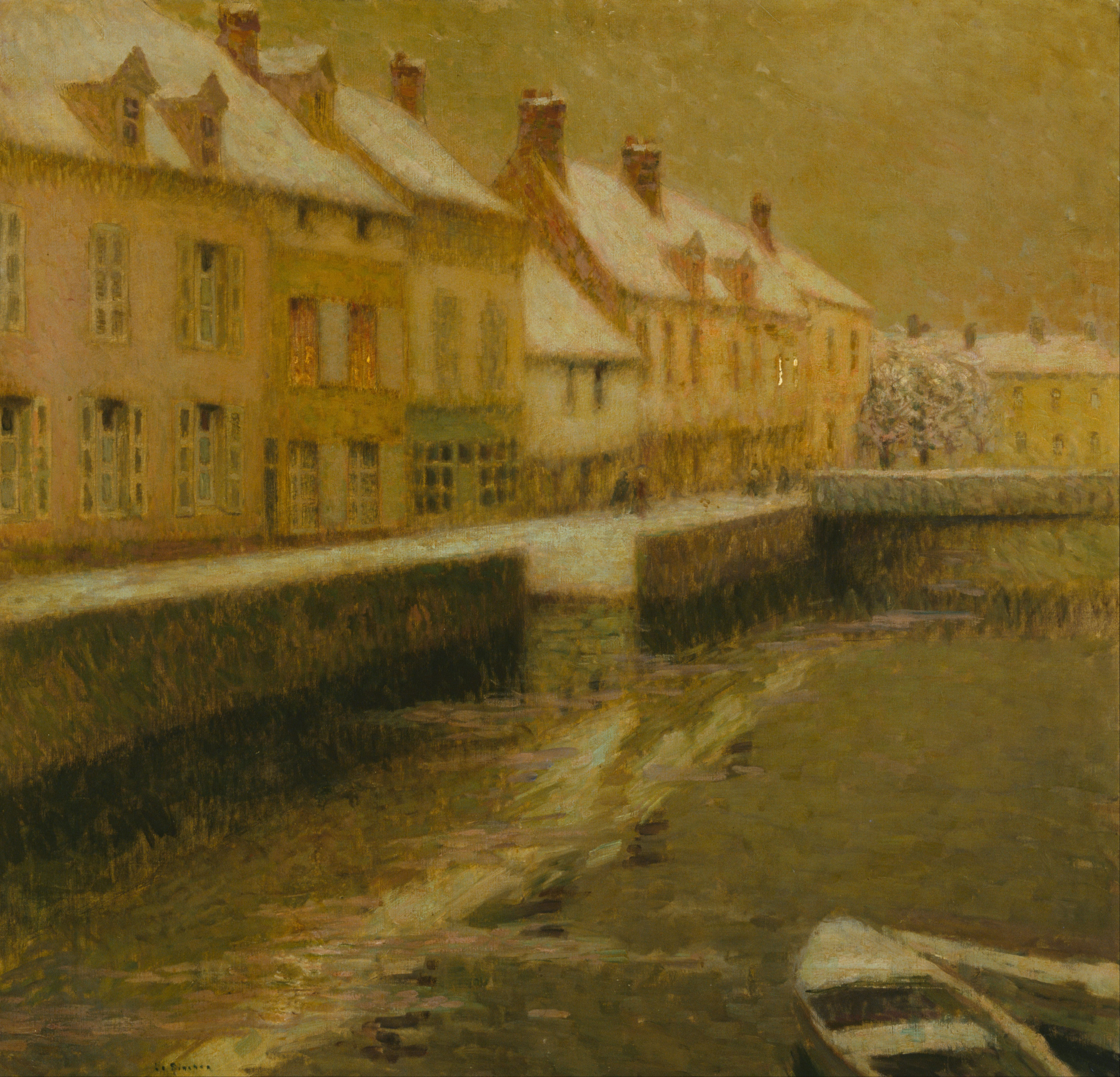
A Bruges Canal

French art witnessed something akin to a schism in 1890 when a group of established artists that included: Puvis de Chavannes, Ernest Meissonier, Carolus-Duran and Carrier-Belleuse, frustrated at what they saw as the atavistic philosophy of the Société des Artistes Français, decided to revitalise, the Société Nationale des Beaux-Arts. They organised an independent exhibition for the work of artists that did not fit the criteria for acceptance by the Paris Salon. The move received government support and the prestigious space of the Champs-de-Mars galleries originally built for the 1878 Exposition Universelle. Le Sidaner was one of the younger artists who preferred to send work to the new Salon and in 1894 he sent two paintings Neige and the symbolist Le Départ De Tobie.

In 1895 Le Sidaner left Étaples and moved to a suburb of Paris where he became part of an artistic clique that included the musician Gabriel Fauré and the art dealer, Georges Petit, to whom Le Sidaner entrusted the sale of his future work. The move to Paris was likely made for career reasons. Le Sidaner much preferred a solitary existence in the French countryside. Whatever the prime reason the Paris stay was short but significant, as in 1898 he eloped to Bruges with the twenty two year old Camille Navarre, to whom he was subsequently married. The success of the Belgian Les XX group of artists had positioned Bruges as a city that was responsive to new ideas and ways of thinking and for Le Sidaner the years in Bruges were pivotal to his subsequent artistic career. It was in Bruges that Le Sidaner painted a series of nocturnes exploring the gloaming light around dusk. They possess a mysticism and convey the silence behind the walls and beneath the waters of Bruges' many canals. (Note: The Belgian writer George Rodenbach's book of poetry Le règne du silence ("The Reign of Silence") from 1888 captures the atmosphere of Bruges. Rodenbach's novels set in Bruges were popular in the French speaking world and one of the reasons that Bruges was seen as fashionable.) La Tour, Bruges (1890) is a strong example of his Bruges period. The Tower is displayed against a sombre blue sky whose light is fading fast. The bottom of the picture is in darkness save for the favoured motif of two solitary lights through a window. In another twilight painting Crépuscule, Maisons Quai De Rosaire (1900) the sombre palette is again off-set by the familiar motif of a lighted window casting its penumbra across the silent waters of the canal.

== The move to Gerberoy and international success ==
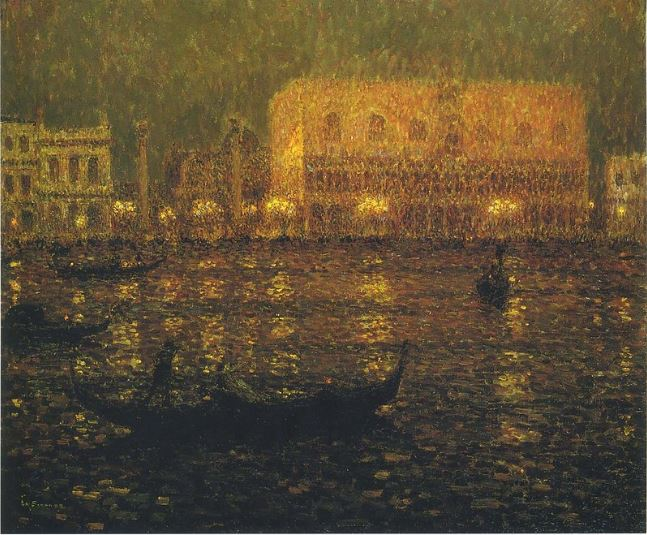
The Grand Canal, Venice (1906)

Le Sidaner held successful solo exhibitions at one of George Petit's Galleries in 1897 and at the La Libre Esthétique in Brussels in 1898. He was keen to buy a country property where he could create a garden and work in reflective solitude. It was on the advice of ceramist Auguste Delaherche that he rented a neglected property at Gerberoy in the Picardy countryside that he subsequently bought in 1904. Once at Gerberoy, Le Sidaner rarely painted figures again preferring to create impressionistic moods through objects that imply human presence. He also set upon the creation of a magnificent garden to rival Monet's at Giverny. In 1902 Le Sidaner joined his old friend Eugène Chigot for an extended visit to Gravelines and Gisors The preference for a few years was to avoid the harsh Oise winters and encamp to milder climes. In 1903 Le Sidaner spent the winter at Chartres and in 1906 in Venice where according to his biographer Mauclair he completed some of his greatest masterpieces. They include a series of nocturne paintings: Le Grand Canal, Le Palais ducal, Le Palais Rouge and the vivid, mysterious La Sérénade, (1906). This series of paintings were highly acclaimed as examples of Le Sidaner's ability to capture atmospheric lighting effects, using dappled brushwork to create a sense of the luminosity of twilight.

Initially displayed at the salon of the Société Nationale des Beaux-Arts they paved the way for a major exhibition in London in 1907/8 where Le Sidaner created a series of works featuring London and Hampton Court Palace and its gardens. The paintings from London possess a dreamlike quality. La balustrade (Hampton Court) which was displayed at the Salon in 1908 is the most abstract painting, the palace's ornamental garden balustrade is shrouded in shimmering blues, greens, aquas, peaches and delicate yellows. The dappled, angled light refracts the moisture in the air to create a delicate, diffused chimera where only the railings are definable. Le Sidaner was by now a successful artist and it allowed him to travel extensively to exhibitions of his work often as an invited guest. These include, for example, his participation in the jury of the Carnegie Institute in Pittsburgh in 1910 and 1912, the Venice Biennial of 1914 which devoted an entire room to him, the 1921 exhibition at the Carnegie Institute in Pittsburgh, at the Musée des Beaux-Arts de Rouen in 1924, the 1929 travelling exhibition in the United States. In 1933 and 1939, the Galerie Charpentier in Paris devoted a private exhibition to his work as did the Musée Galliéra in 1948.

== The later years ==
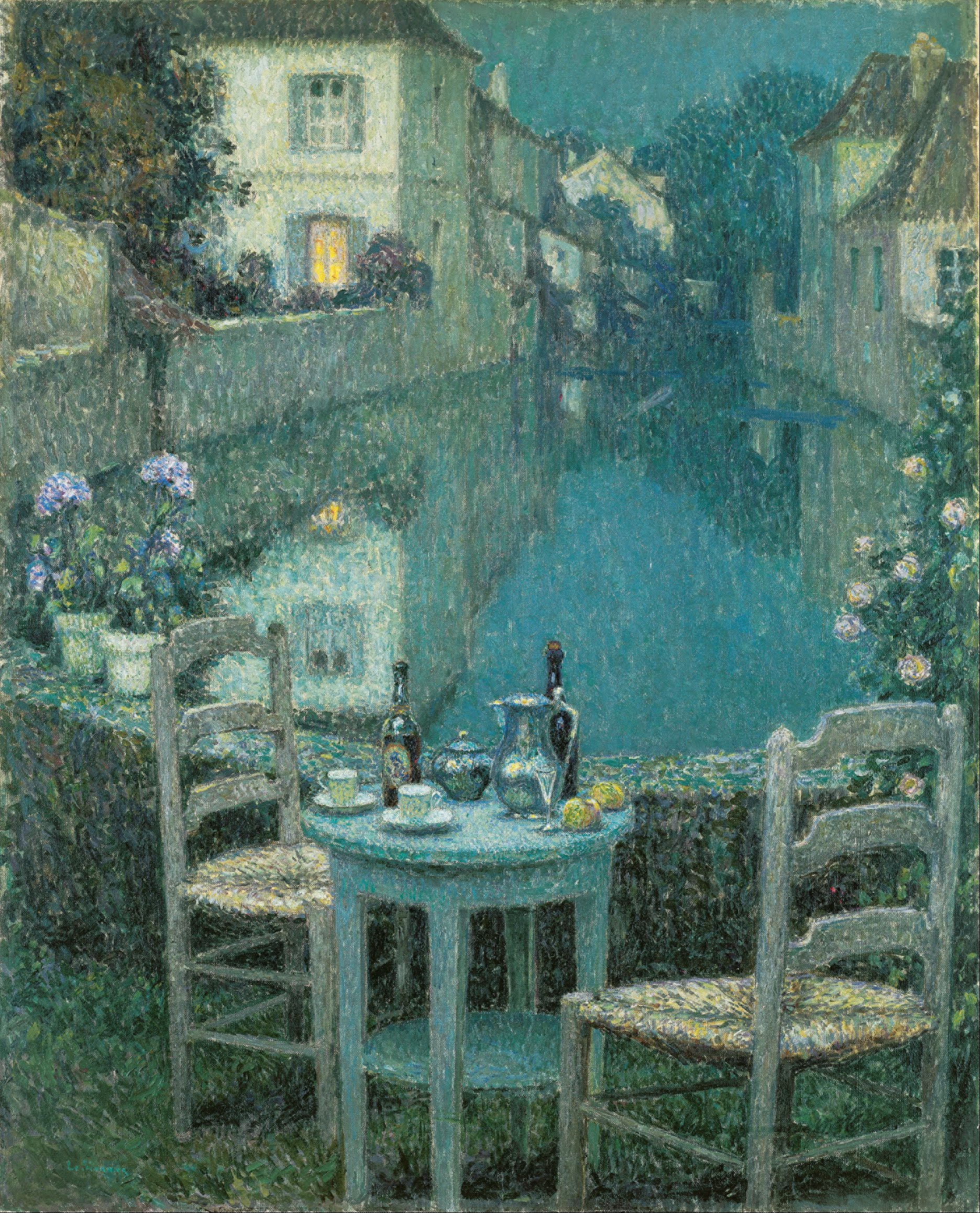
Petite table dans le crépuscule du soir (1921).

In the years following the turmoil of the First World War Le Sidaner's painting evolved further as his choice of colours became brighter and more intense. The rue de l'Eglise, Villefranche-sur-Mer (1928), now at Thyssen-Bornemisza Museum in Madrid is typical of his later work. It is vibrant with reds, oranges and green, and depicts a seemingly ordinary street in Villefranche overlooking a narrow steep passageway leading to a church. There is a figure in red on the stairs almost submerged in the building, a symbol of light into darkness. It was a colourful departure from the hazy, diffused depictions of light that characterised his middle years. Throughout the 1920s, Le Sidaner painted across France from Brittany to the Côte d'Azur where he often stayed at Villefranche-sur-Mer and from his homes in Versailles and Gerberoy where he painted intimist studies of domestic interiors particularly, of vacated tables that included La Table, harmonie blanche (1927) a study in white, which recalls Whistler, bathed in a poetic somnolence. Camille Mauclair calls it the Art du silence (art of silence).

Mauclair regarded Le Sidaner in high esteem but a number of critics note disapproval at his continual reuse of familiar themes. (Note: Marcel Proust comments on Le Sidaner's work in his epic À la recherche du temps perdu (In Search of Lost Time) Volume Four: Sodom and Gomorrah, the narrator mentions that an eminent barrister from Paris had devoted his income to collecting the paintings of the "highly distinguished" but "not great" Le Sidaner.) As recently as 2012 art critic C.B. Liddell noted that he was set in an ever-lasting, default twilight, the same moment eternally perpetuated in painting after painting to the detriment that the viewer never has a sense of Le Sidaner's true feelings. Le Sidaner died in Versailles on 16 July 1939.

His reputation declined during the post World War Two period but has since received a revaluation with exhibitions (selected) dedicated to his work at: Musee d'art moderne et contemporain of Liège (1996), Musee de la chartreuse, Douai (2001), Musee of Pont-Aven (2002), Hiroshima Museum of Art (2012) and Musée Baron-Martin, Gray. France (2014).

== Legacy ==
The gardens that Le Sidaner created at his home in Gerberoy are now open to the public, as is his former studio.

There are roads named after him in Montpellier, Versailles, and Dunkirk.

== Biography ==
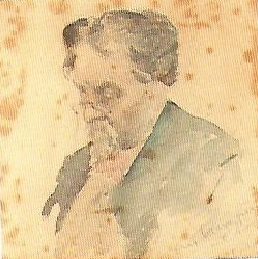
Alphonse Chigot (1881), watercolour.

- Camille Mauclair (1928) English translation A Rickard (2019), Henri Le Sidaner, The Obolous Press, Newmarket, Ontario, Canada. ISBN 9780981178035
- Yann Farinaux- Le Sidaner, (1989) Le Sidaner, L’Oeuvre peint et gravé, Éditions André Sauret, Monaco. ASIN B00166TYK4
- Henri Le Sidaner, 1862-1939 et la Bretagne : Exposition, Pont-Aven, Musée de Pont-Aven, 29 juin-30 septembre 2002 - Exhibition catalogue.

== Bibliography ==
- Yann Farinaux-Le Sidaner, Catalog raisonné of the Work of Henri Le Sidaner, Éditions André Sauret,(1989).
- Jean-François Mancel, Josette Galiègue, et al.,(2001) Henri le Sidaner en son jardin de Gerberoy, Éditions Monelle Hayot. Editions d'art Monelle Hayot. ISBN 978-2903824327
- Edith Marcq (2019), La Côte d'Opale et ses peintres au XIX ème siècle à la fin de l'entre-deux-guerres: l'individualité de son appellation à ses diverses représentations picturales,
- Véronique Bouruet Aubertot (2017), Impressionism: The Movement that Transformed Western Art, AVA Publishing SA, ISBN 9782080203205
- Laura Gascoigne (2014), Henri Le Sidaner: the artist who fell between two schools, The Spectator magazine 10 May 2014.
- Heinz Widauer (2016), Ways of Pointillism: Seurat, Signac, Van Gogh, Hirmer. ISBN 9783777426341
- Valentin Grivet (2020), French Painting: Franzosische Malerei, Pintura Francesa 1830–1920, Koenemann. ISBN 9783741929298
- Alan Bowness, (1979), Post-Impressionism. Cross-Currents in European Painting, Royal Academy of Arts & Weidenfeld and Nicolson, London ISBN 0297777130

== Illustrations of works (selected) ==
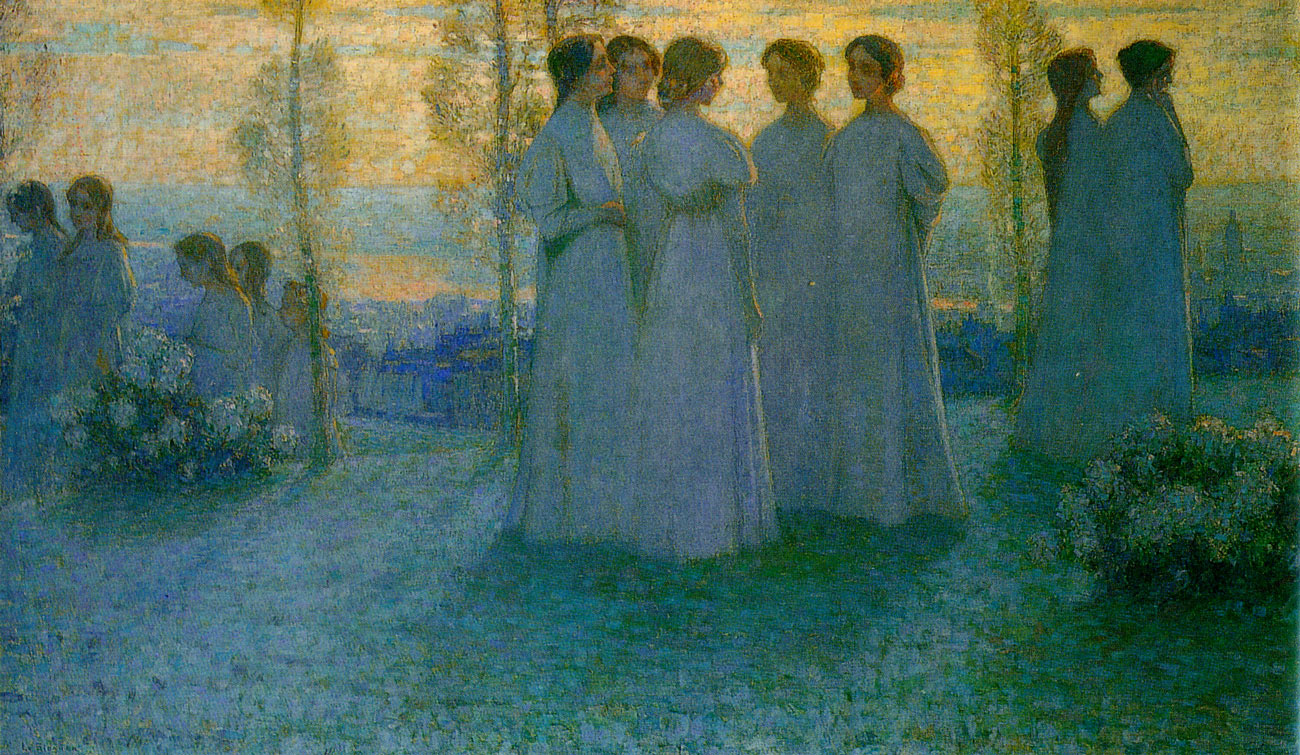

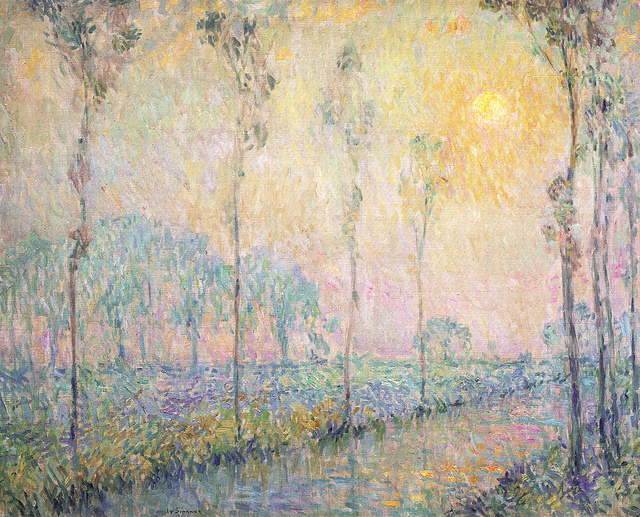

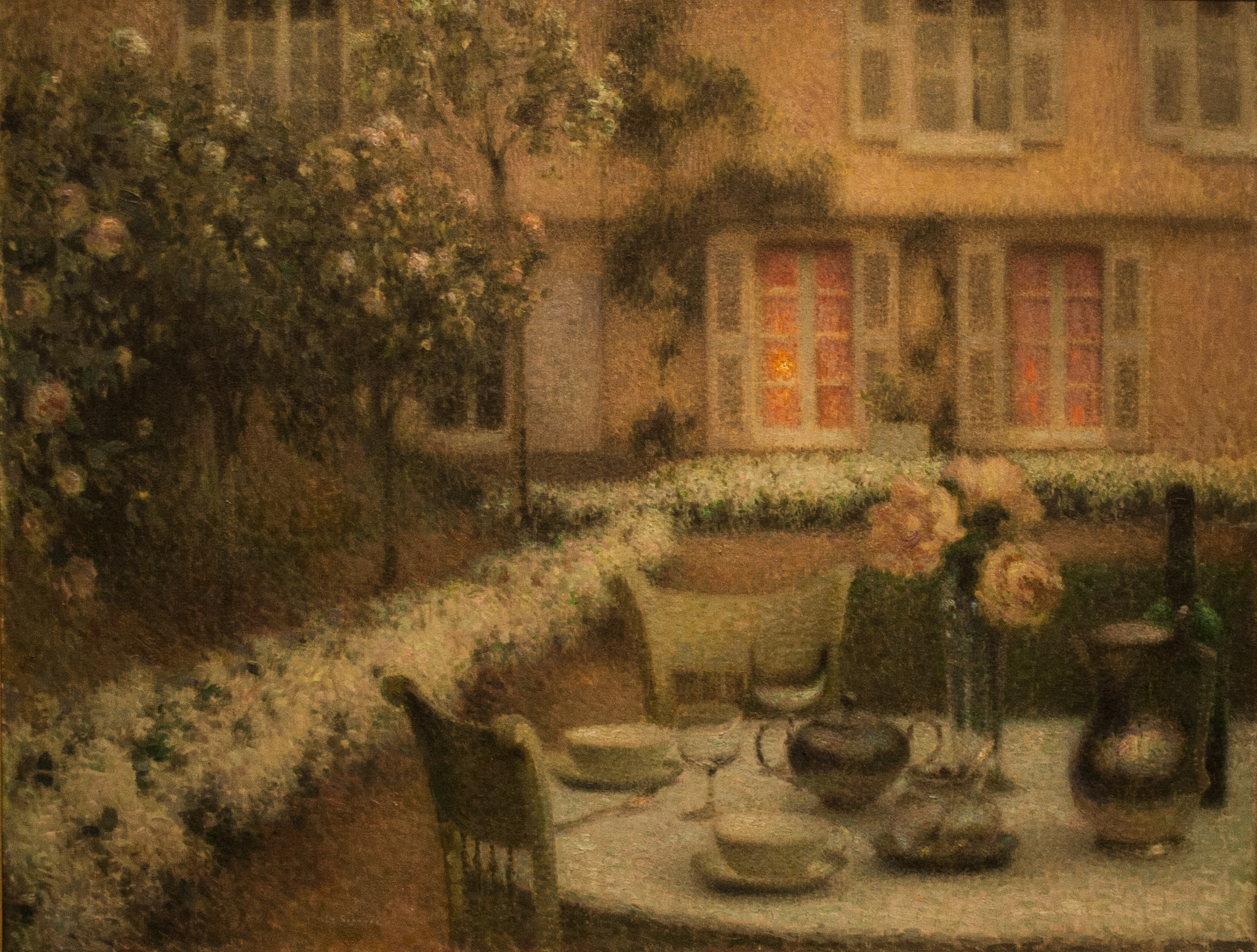

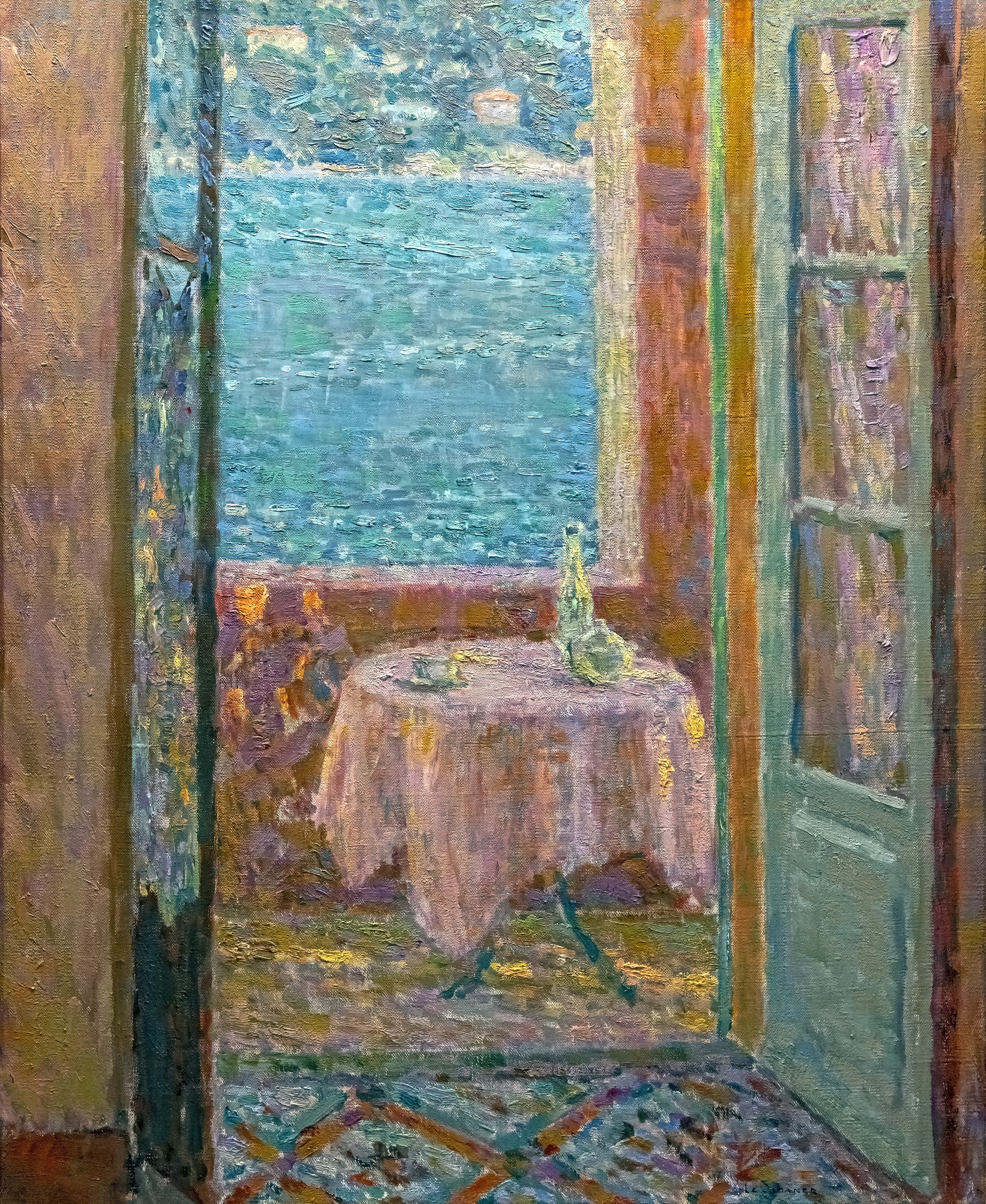

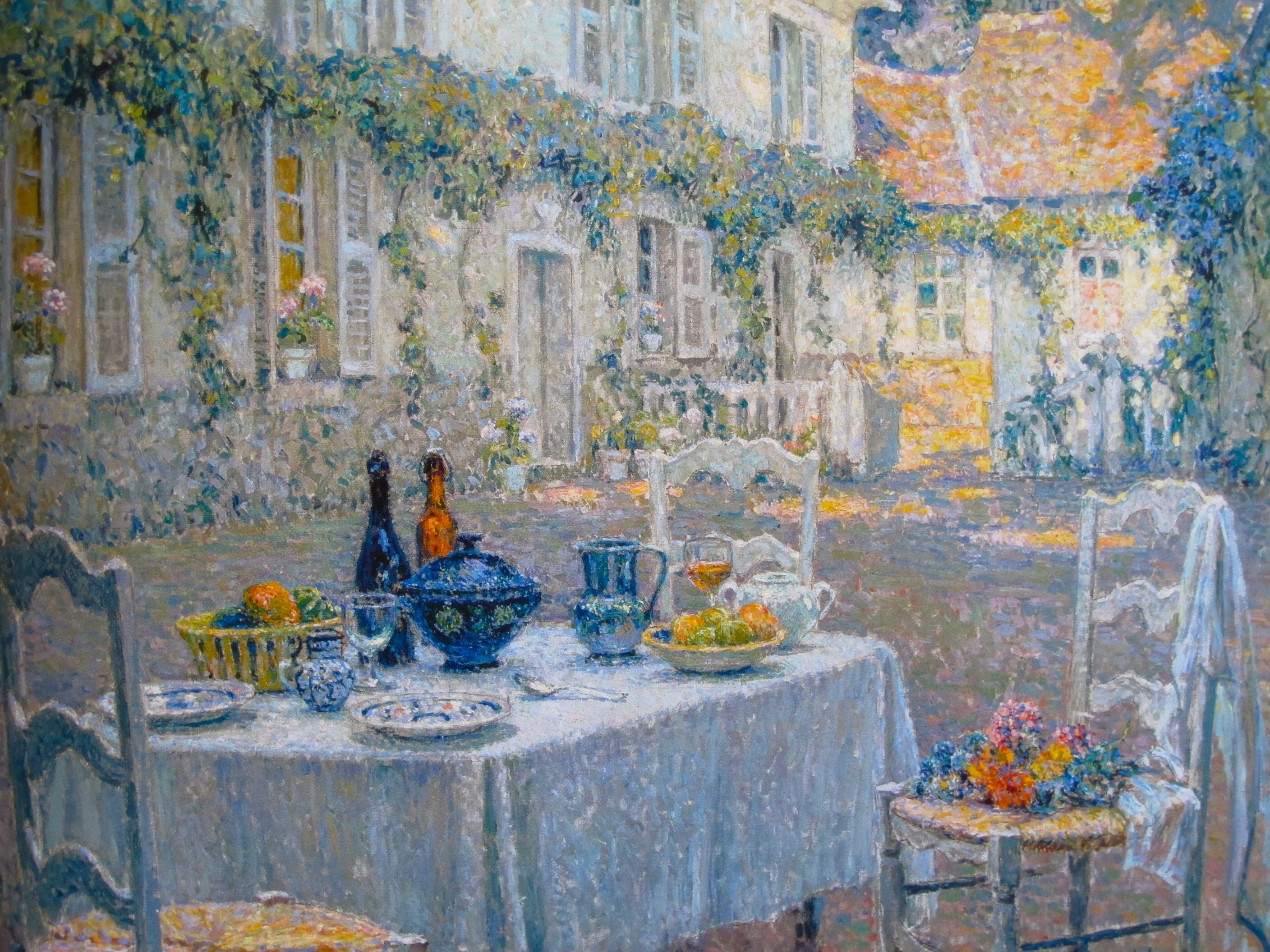

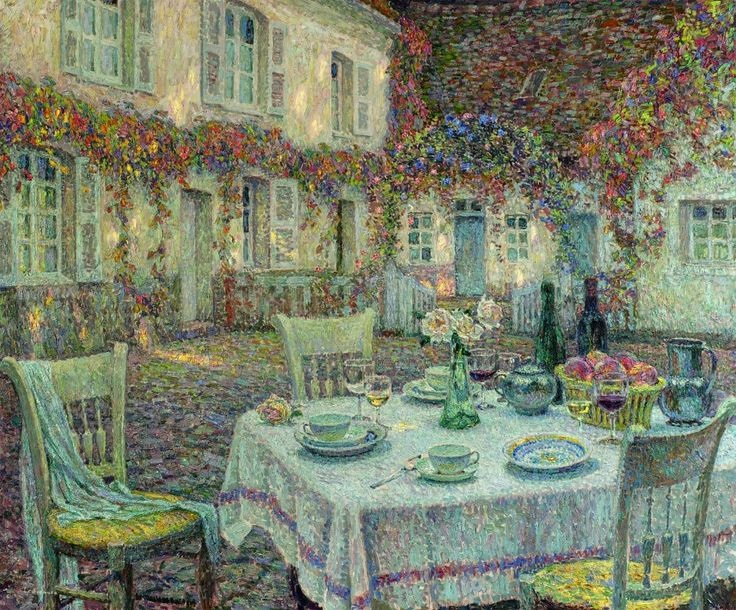

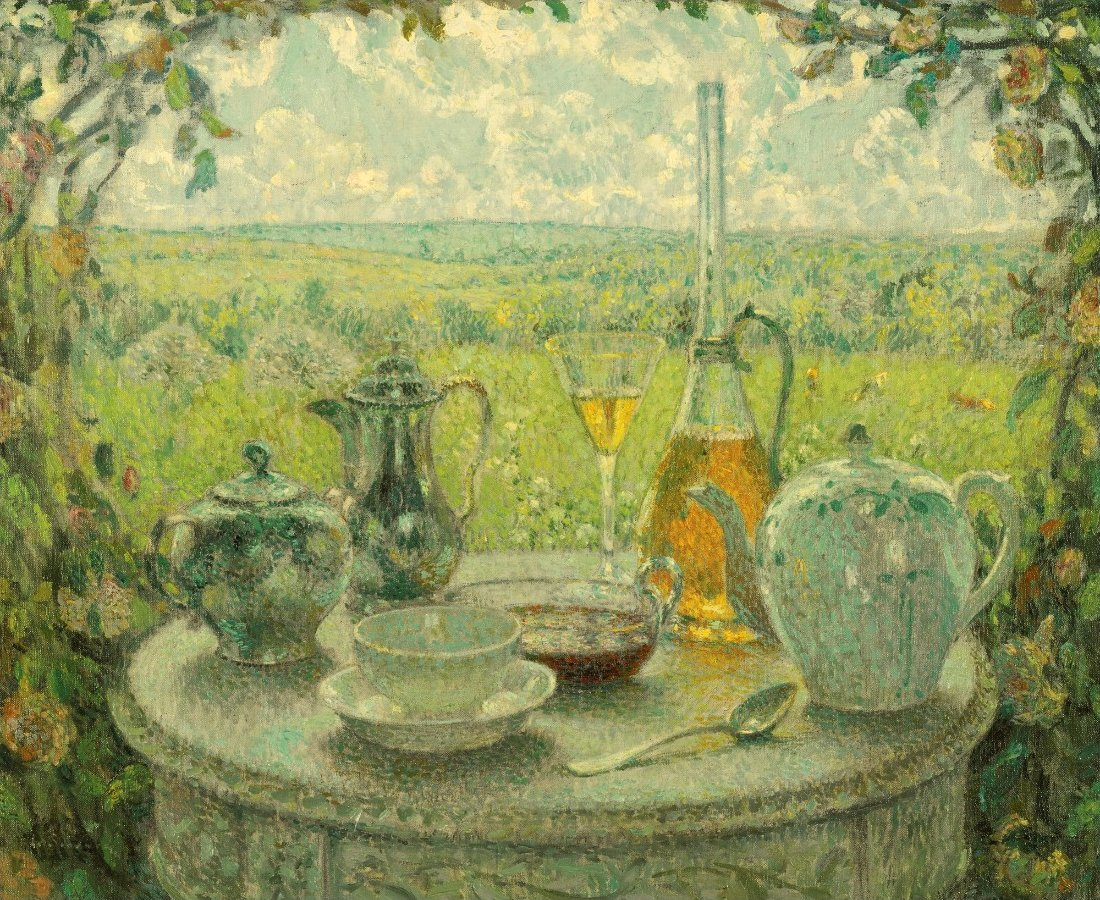

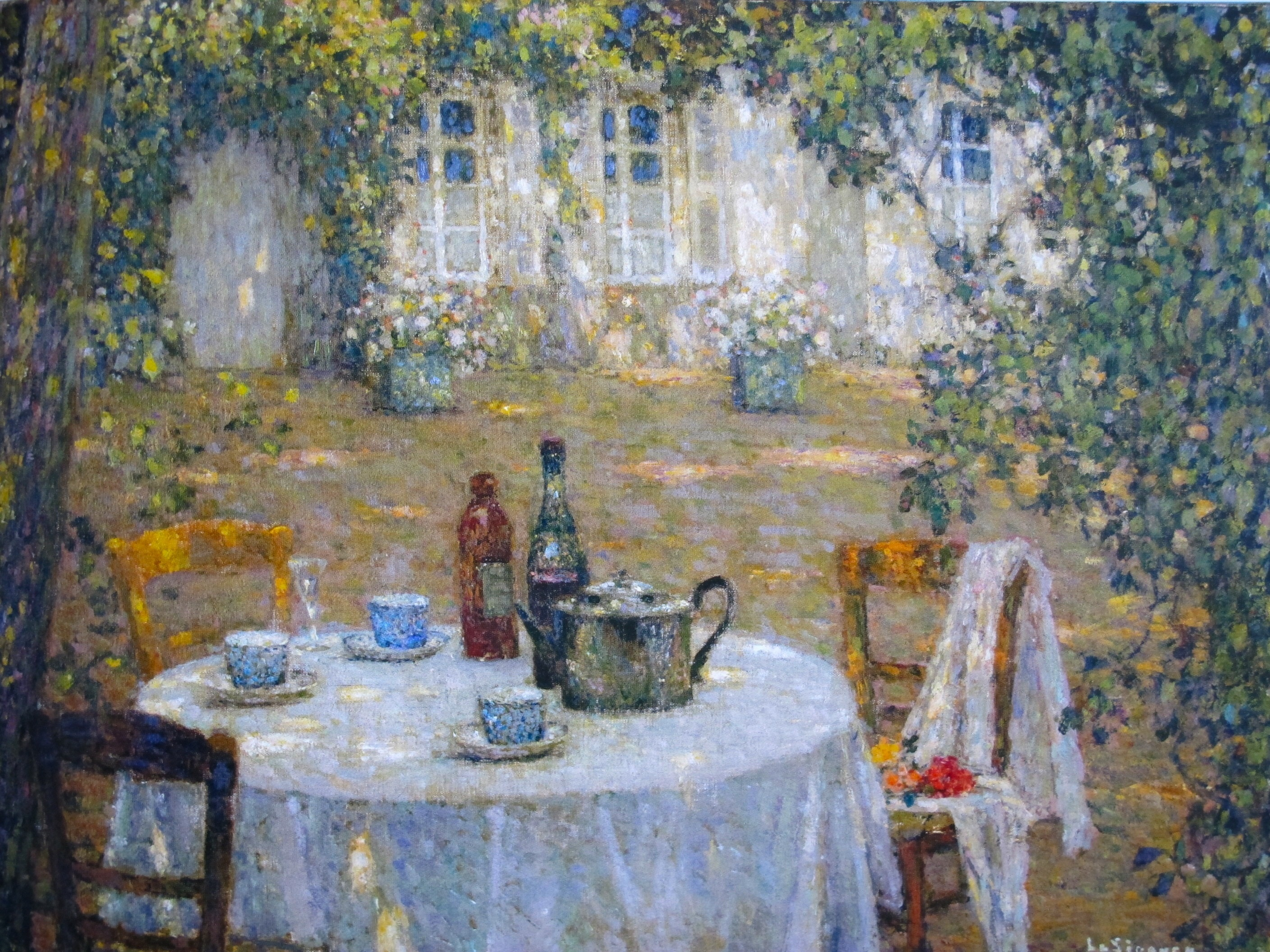

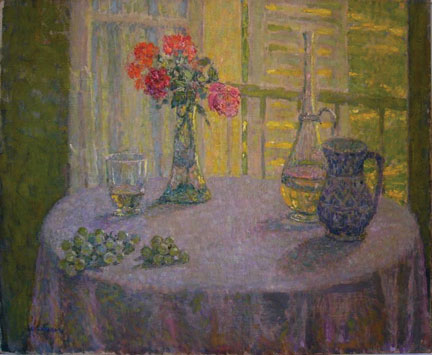

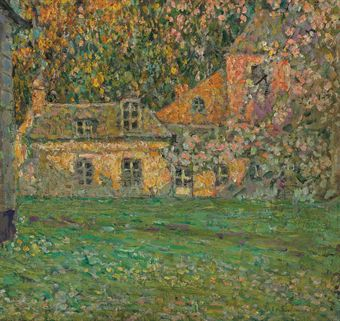

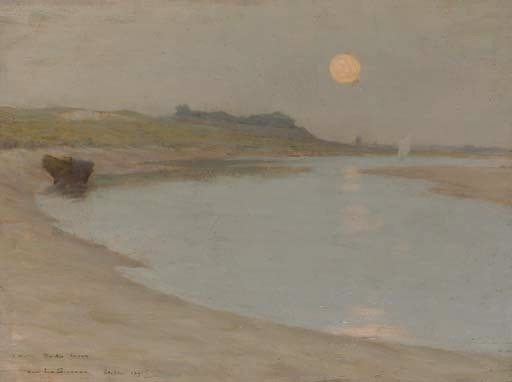

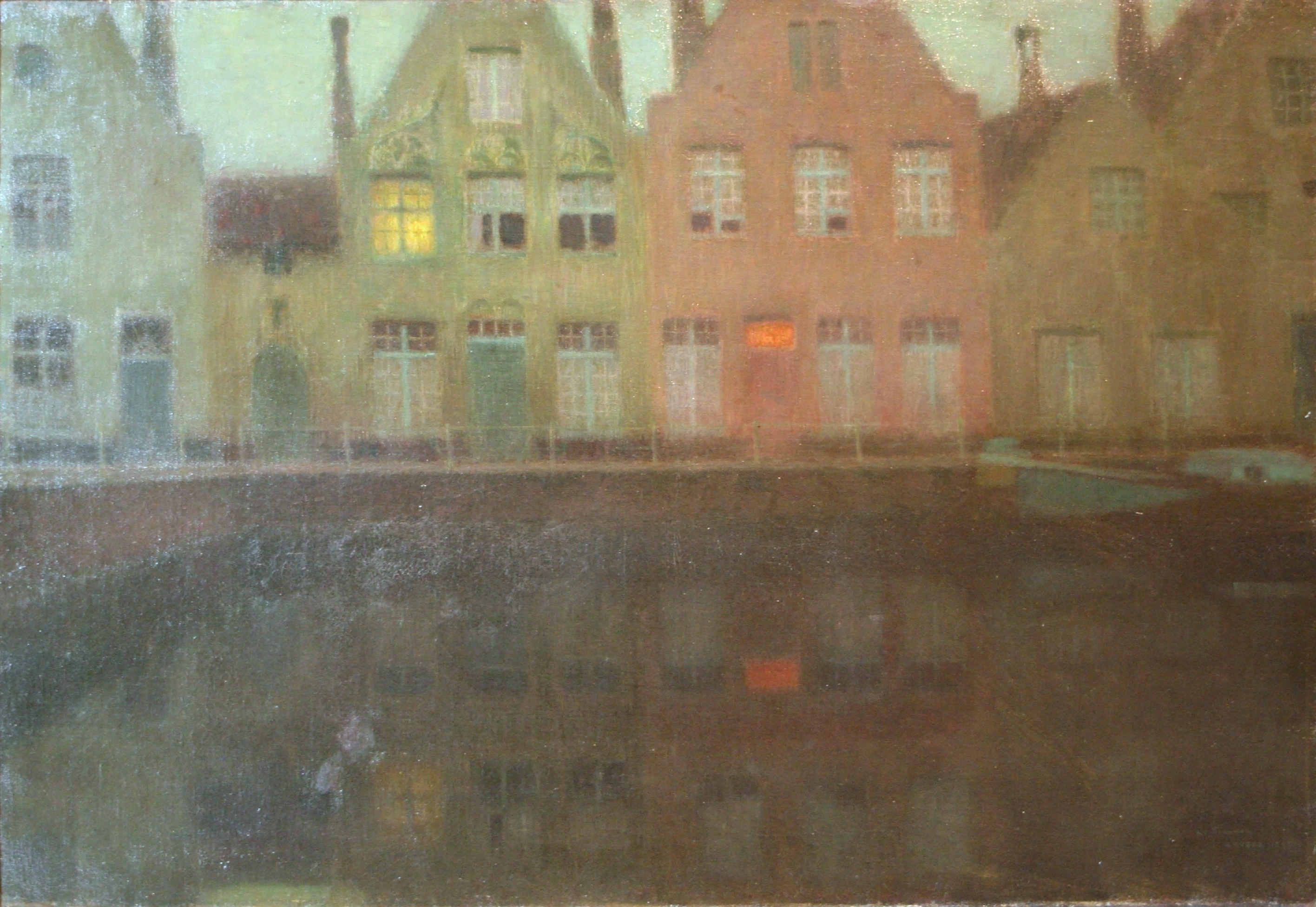

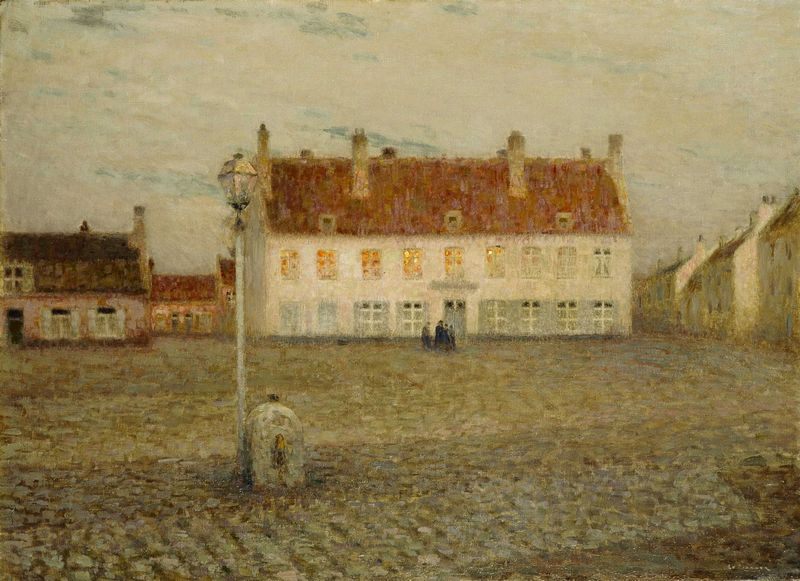

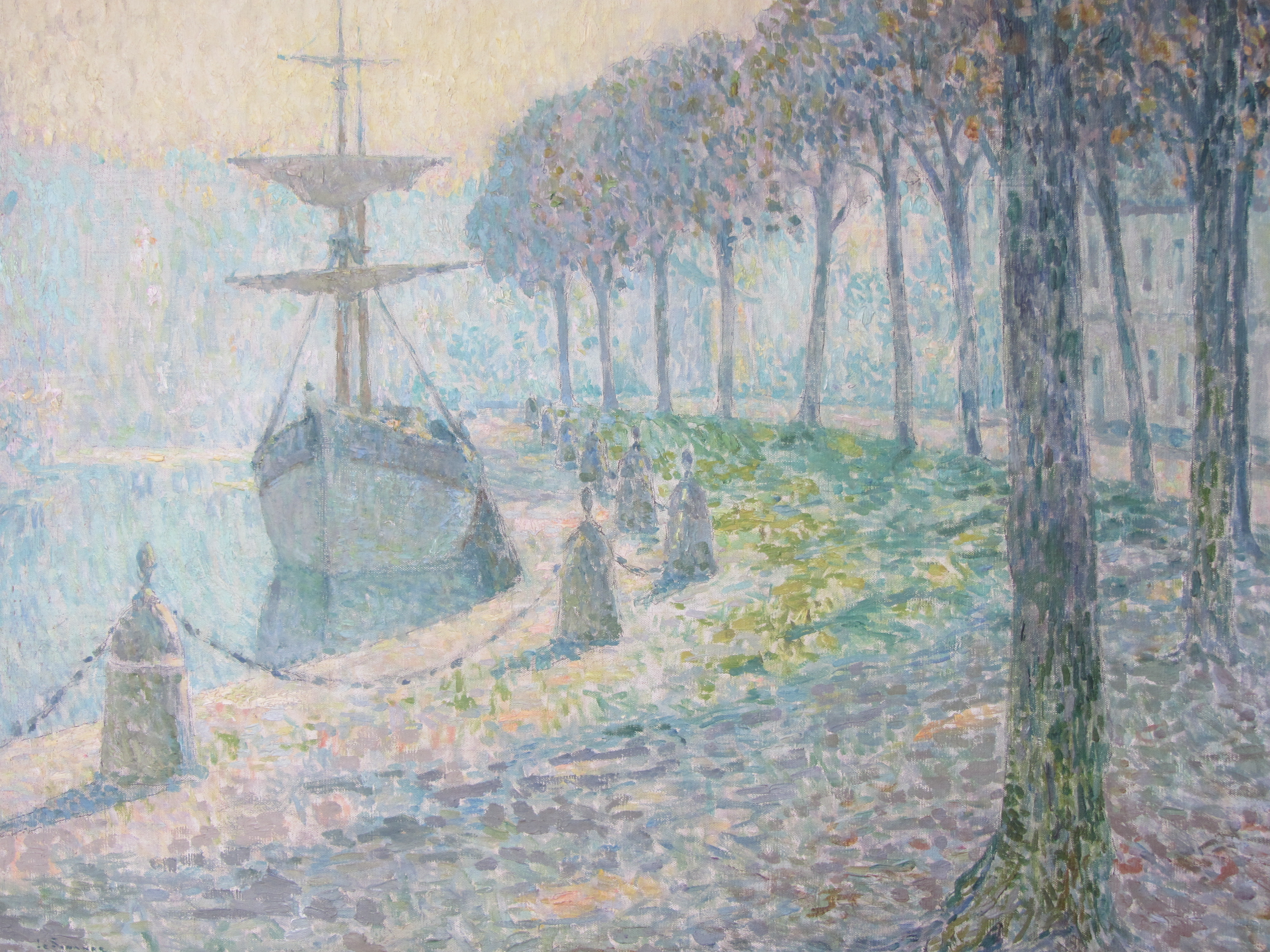

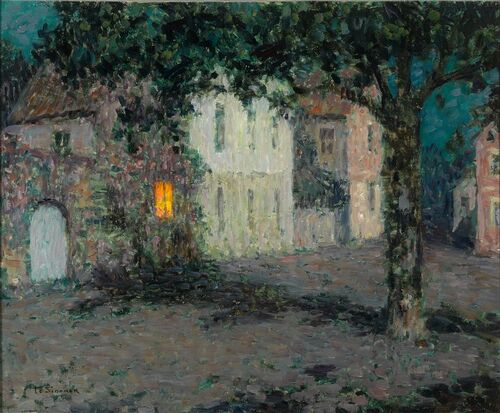

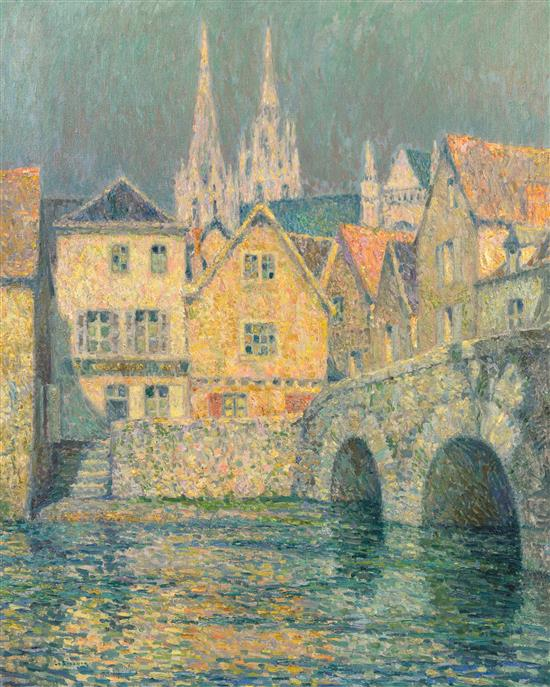

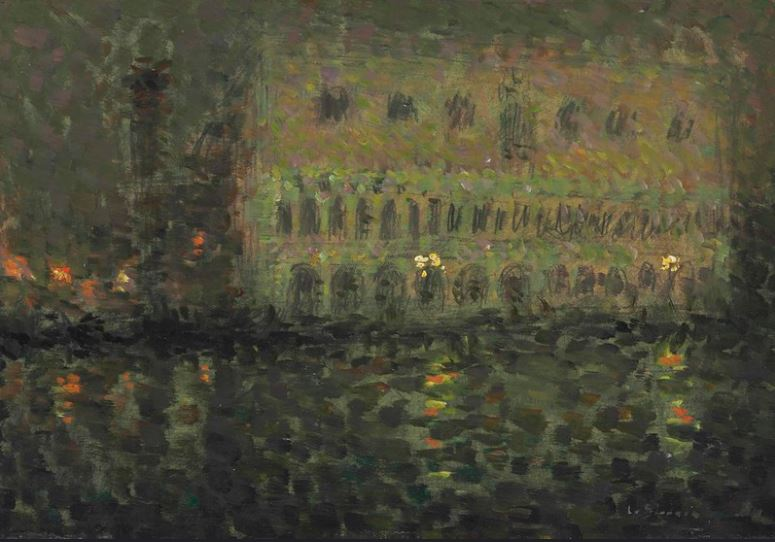

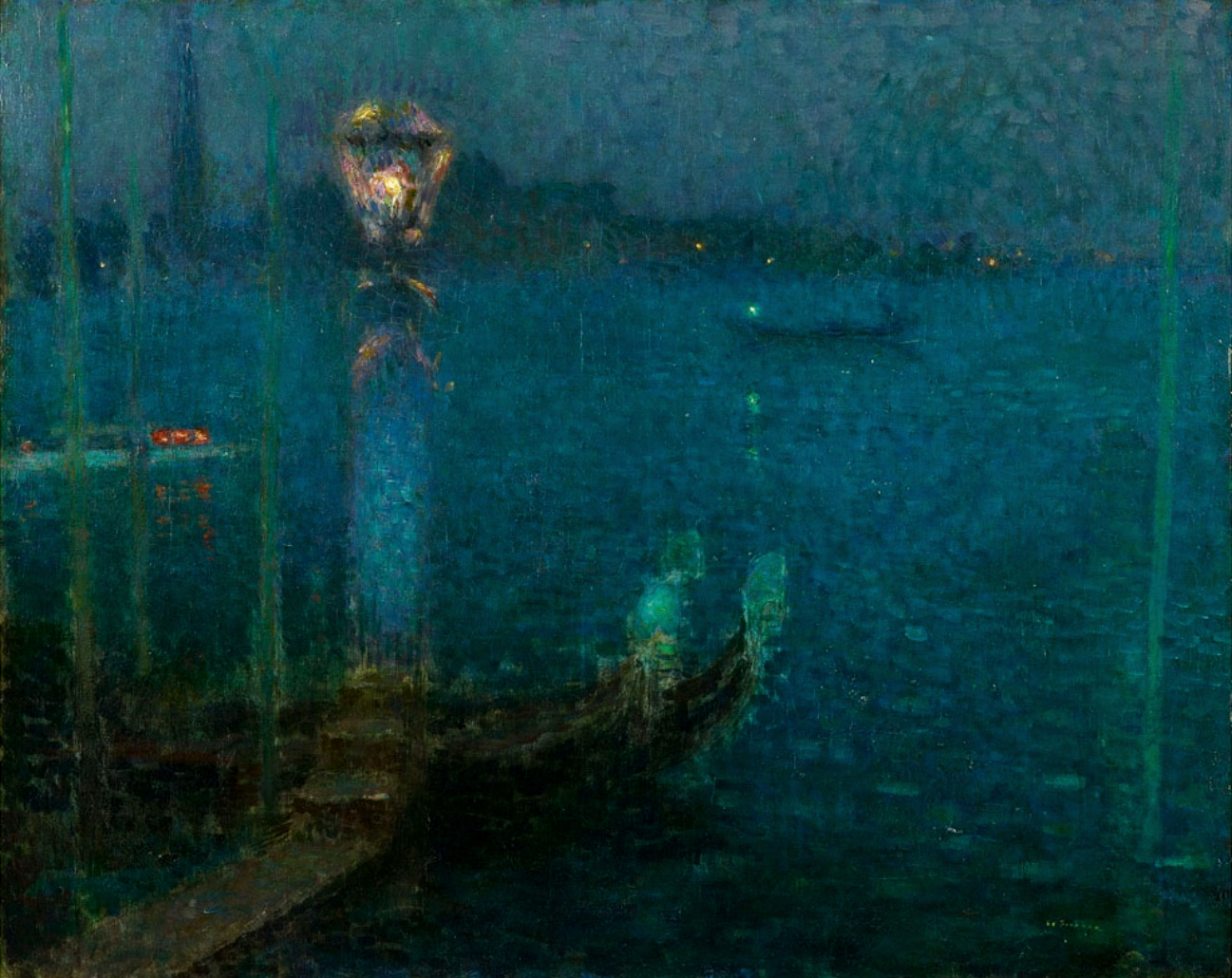

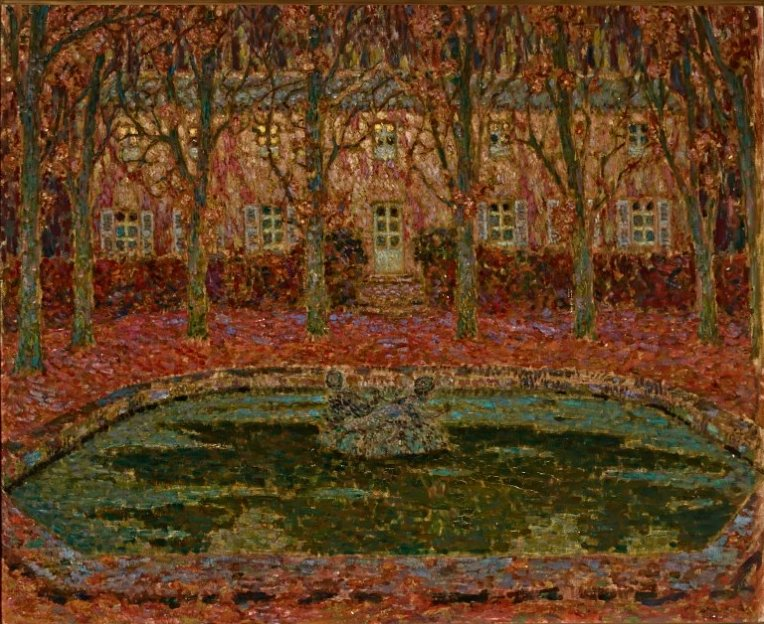

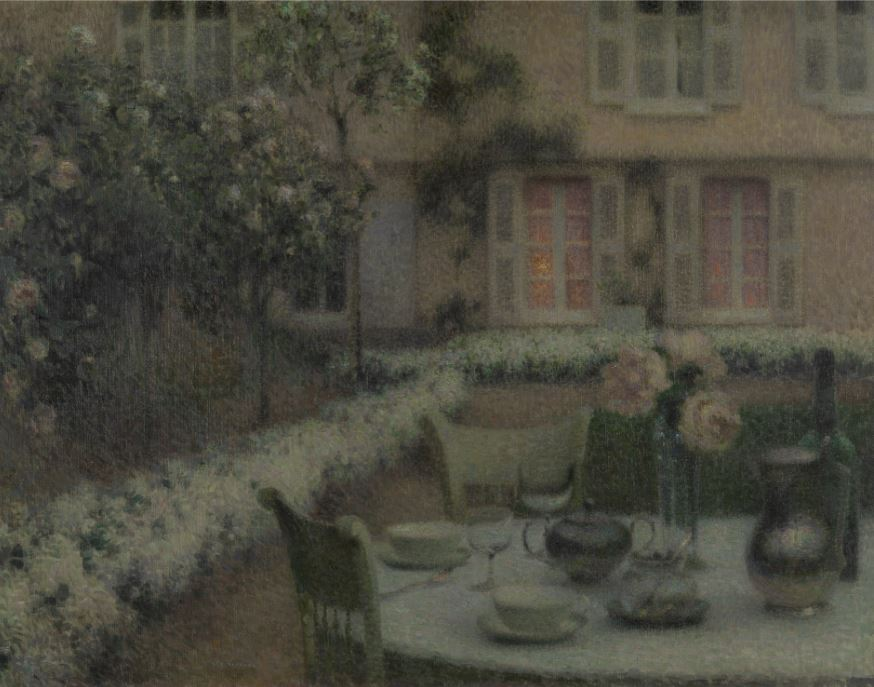

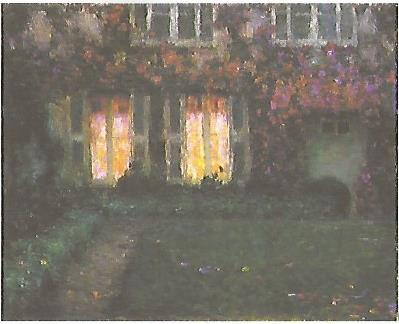

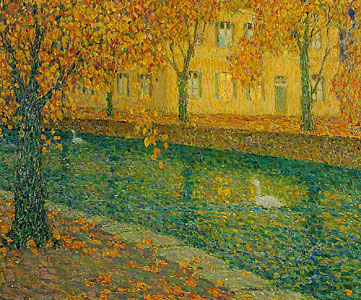

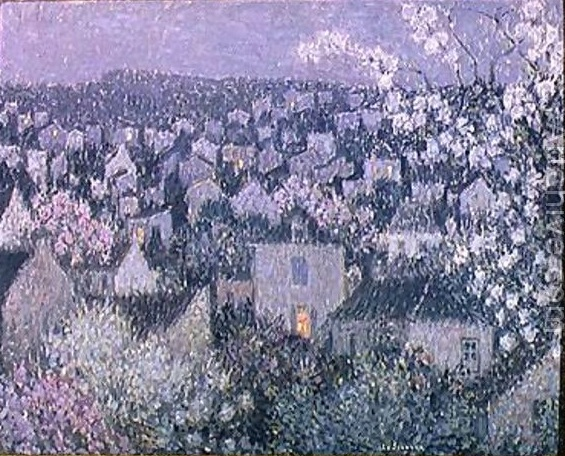

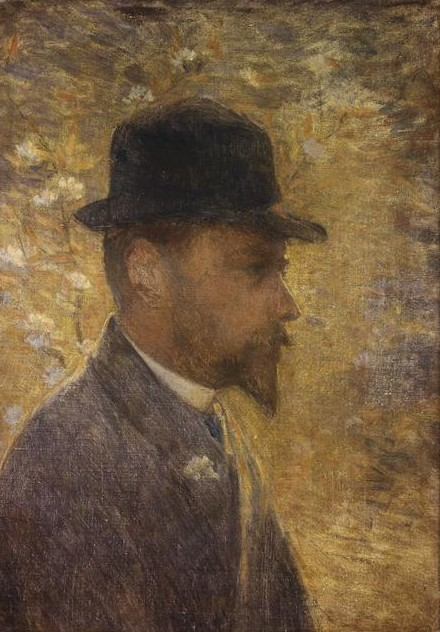
Portrait by Marie Duhem.

== Gallery of Gerberoy ==
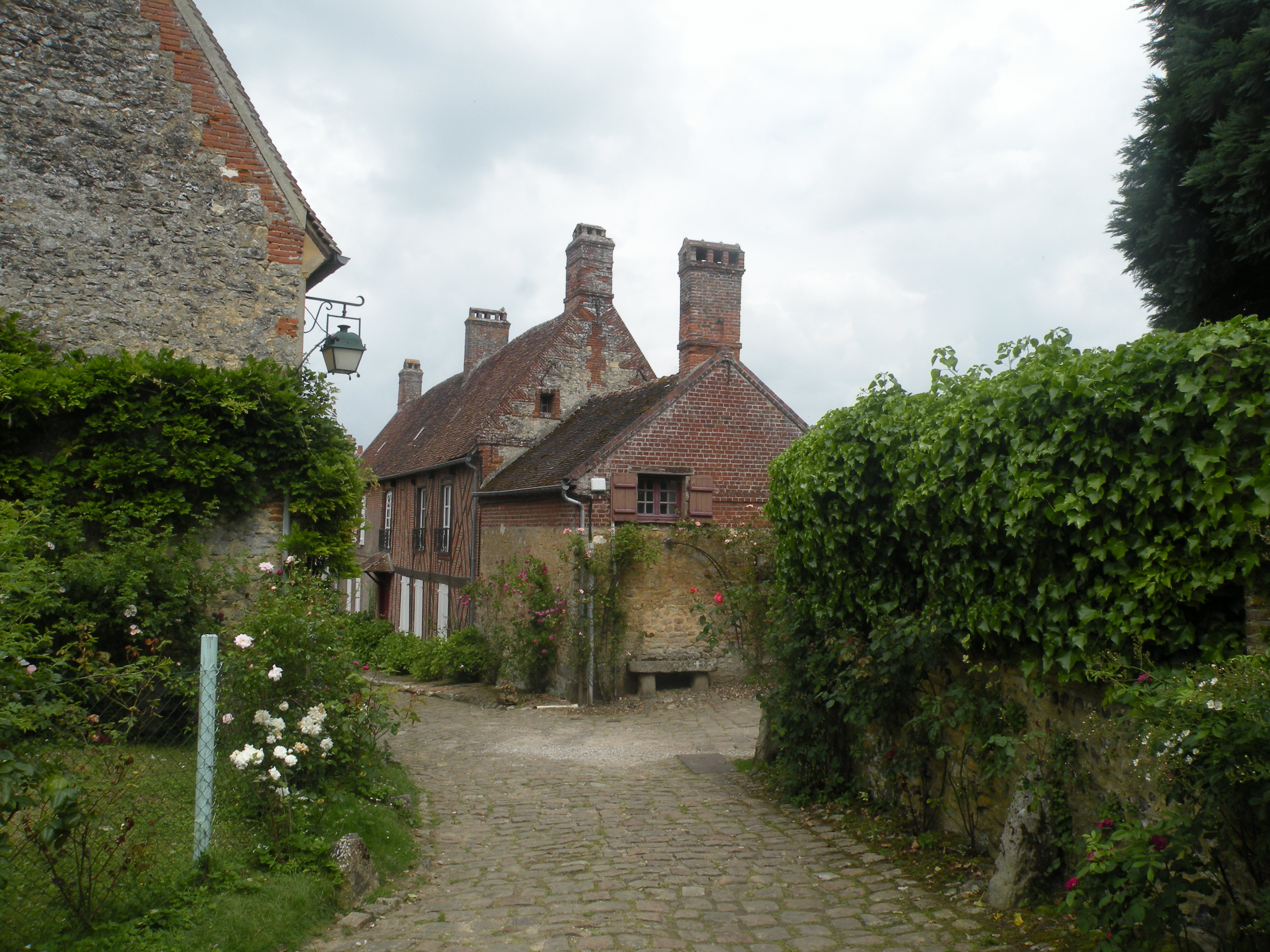

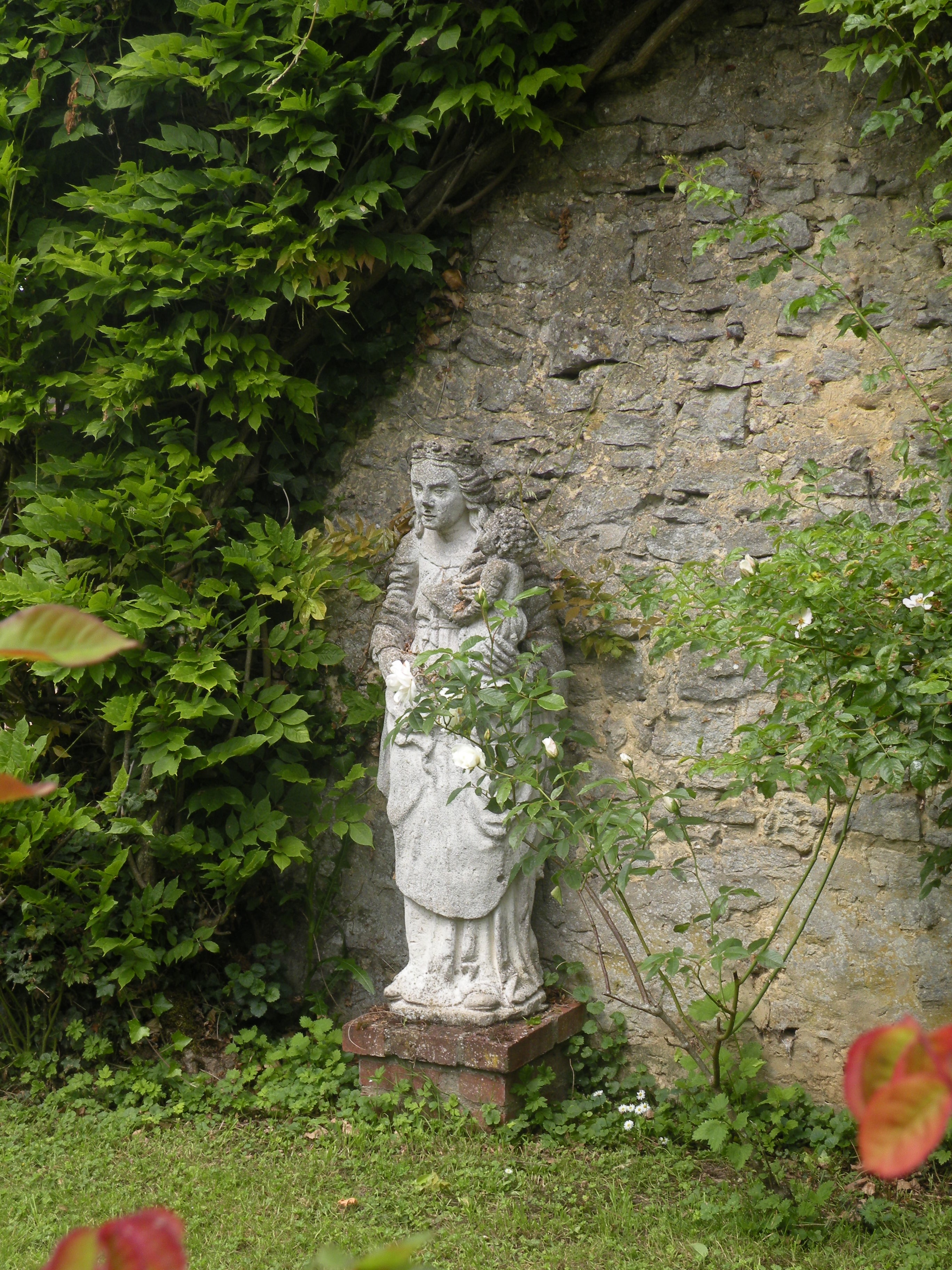

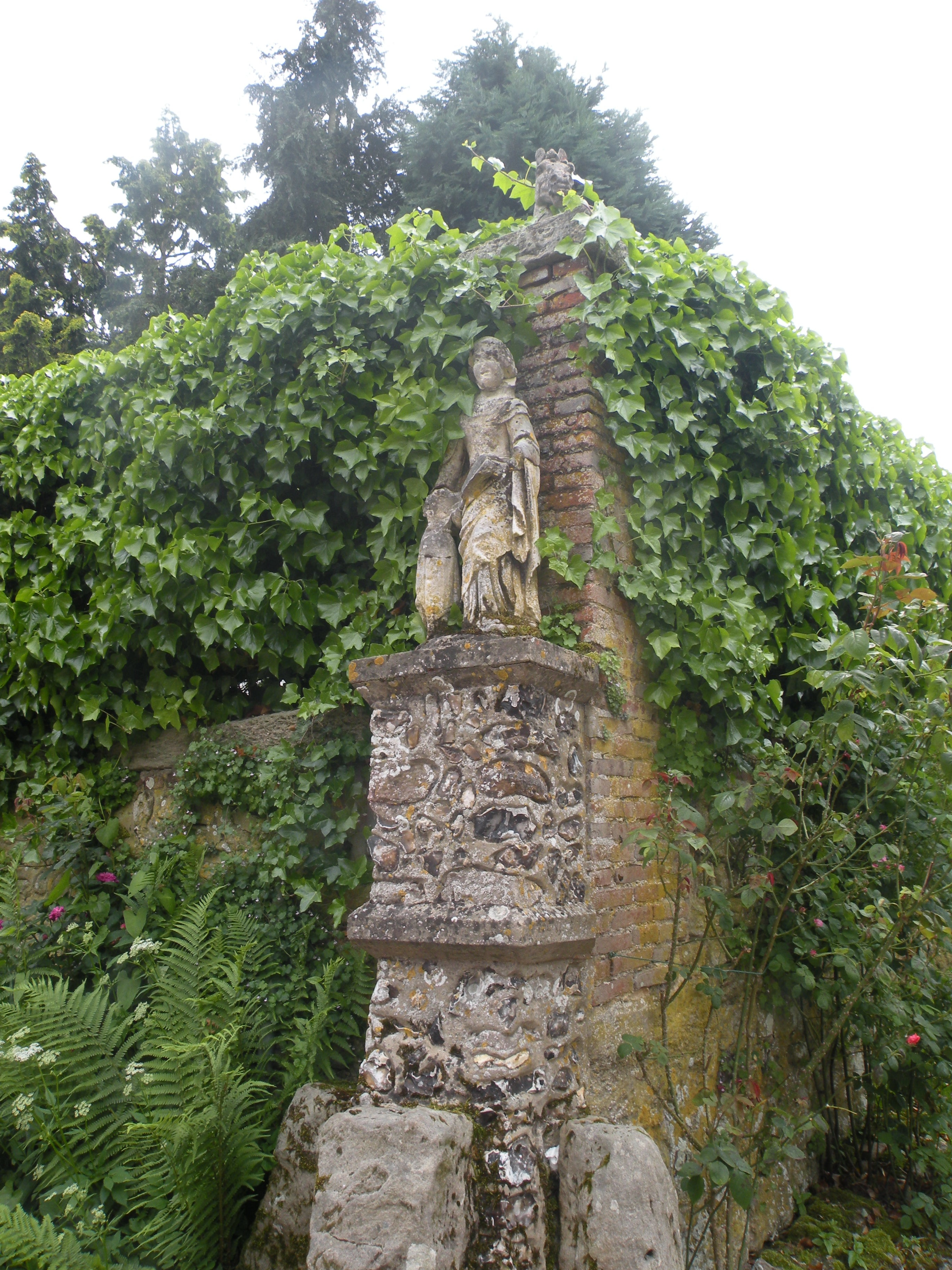

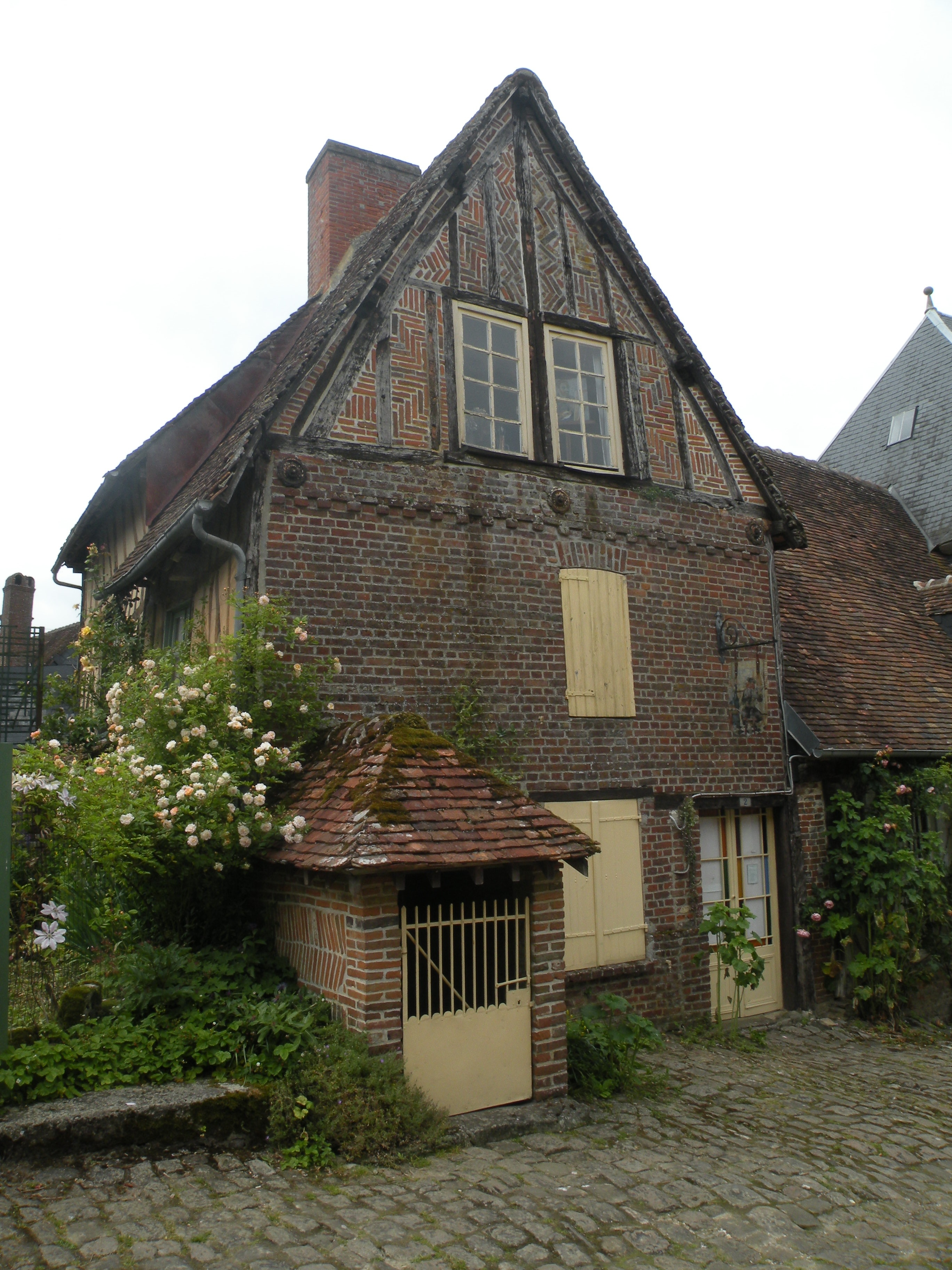

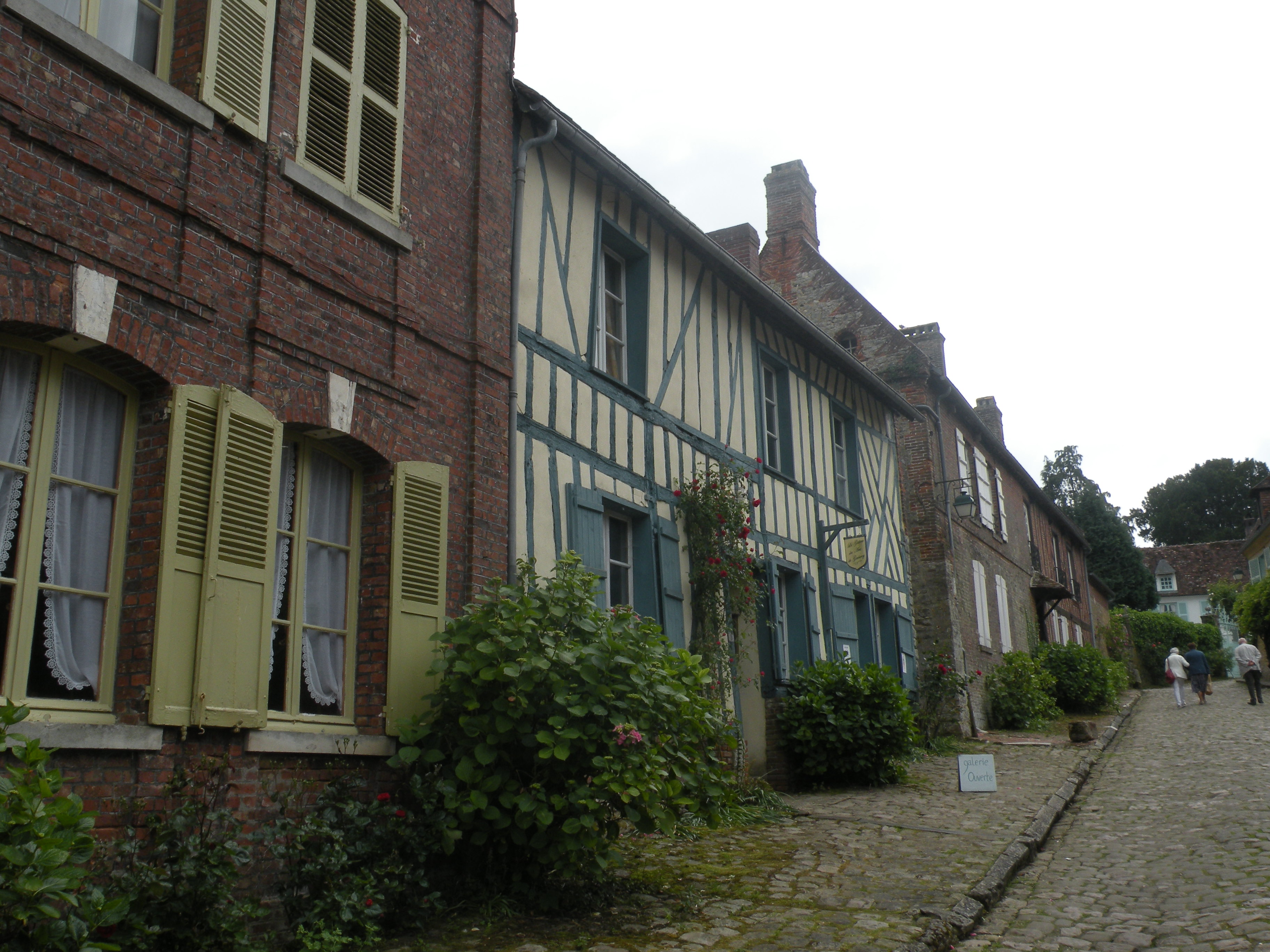

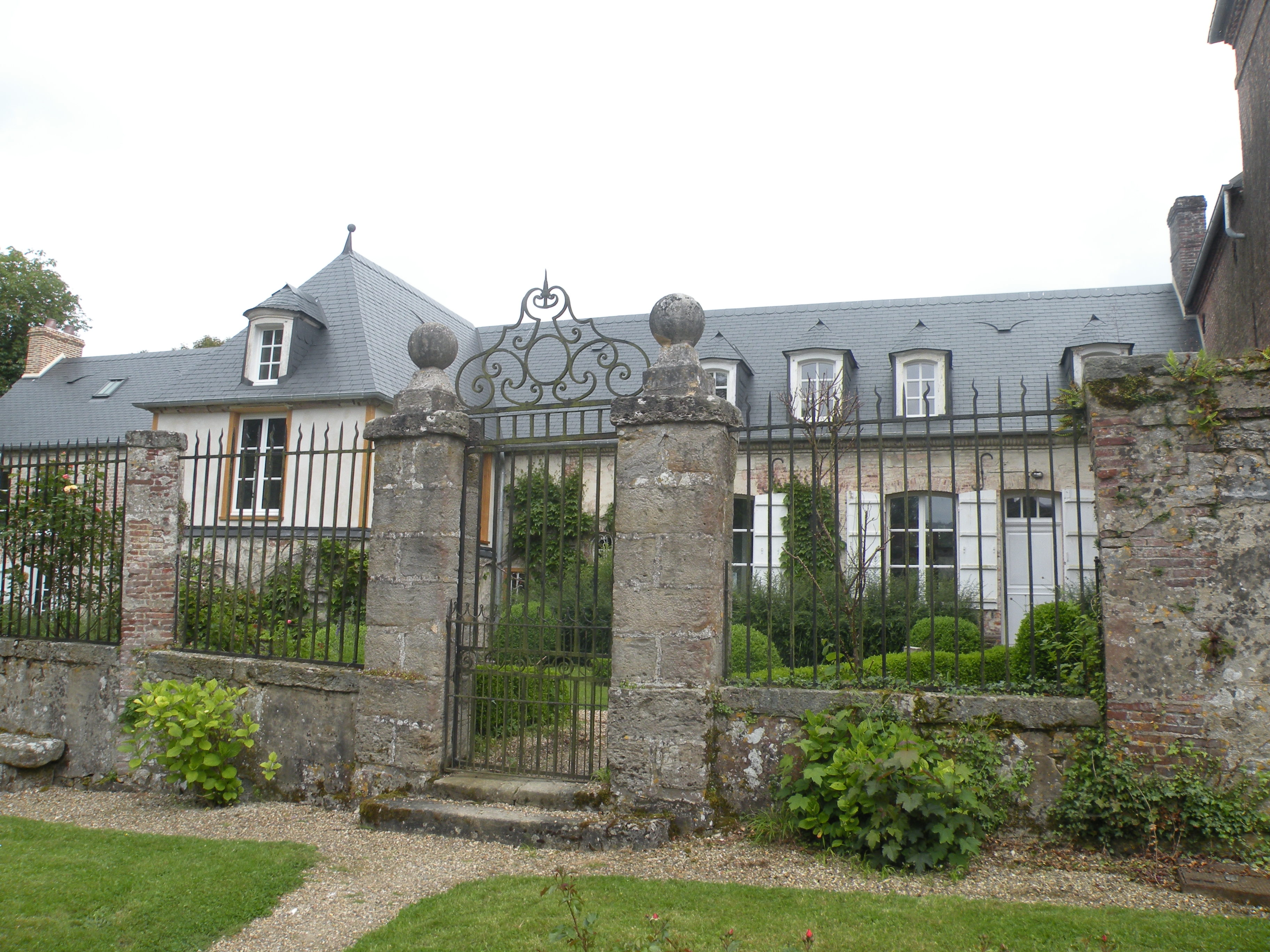

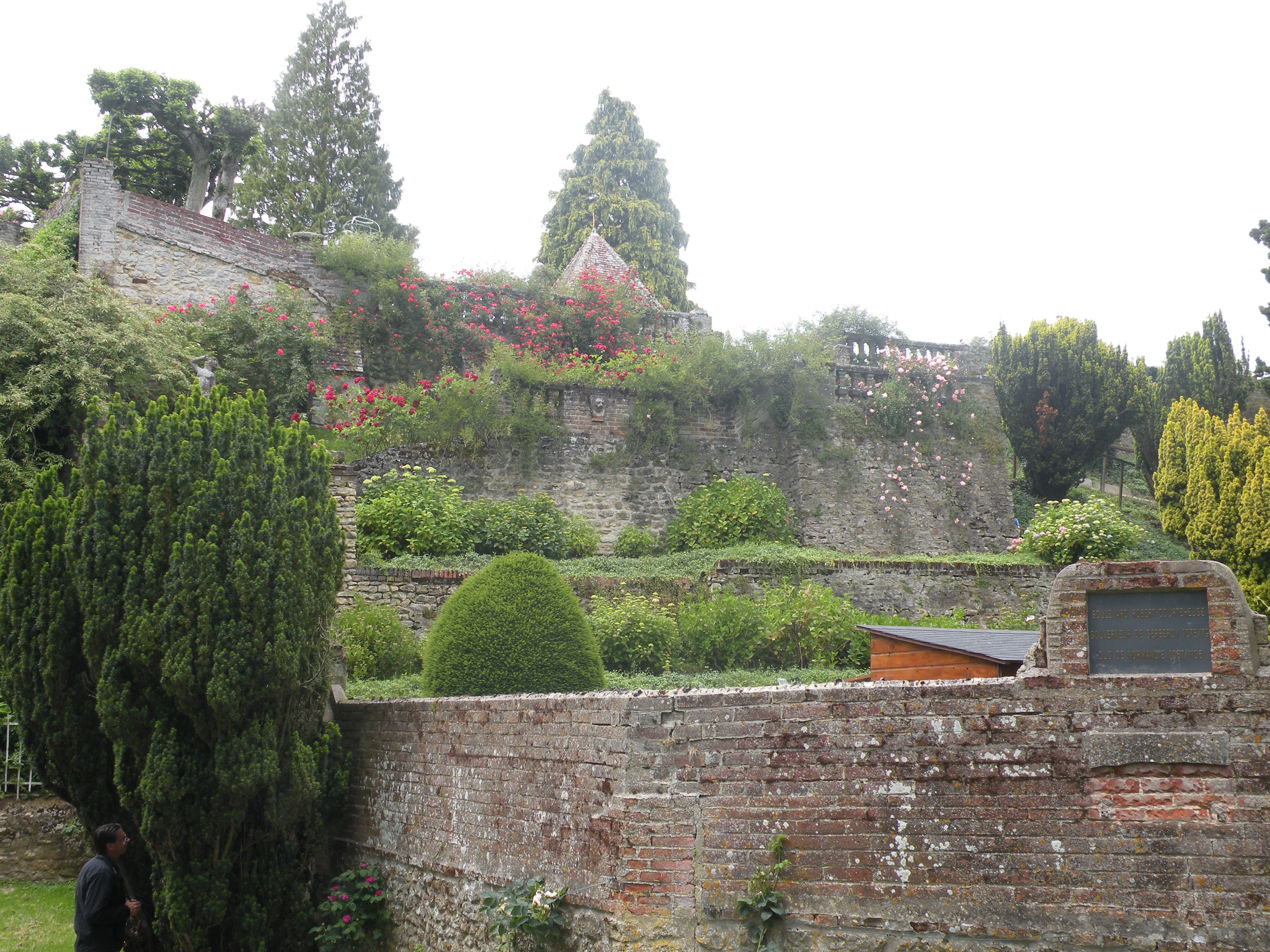

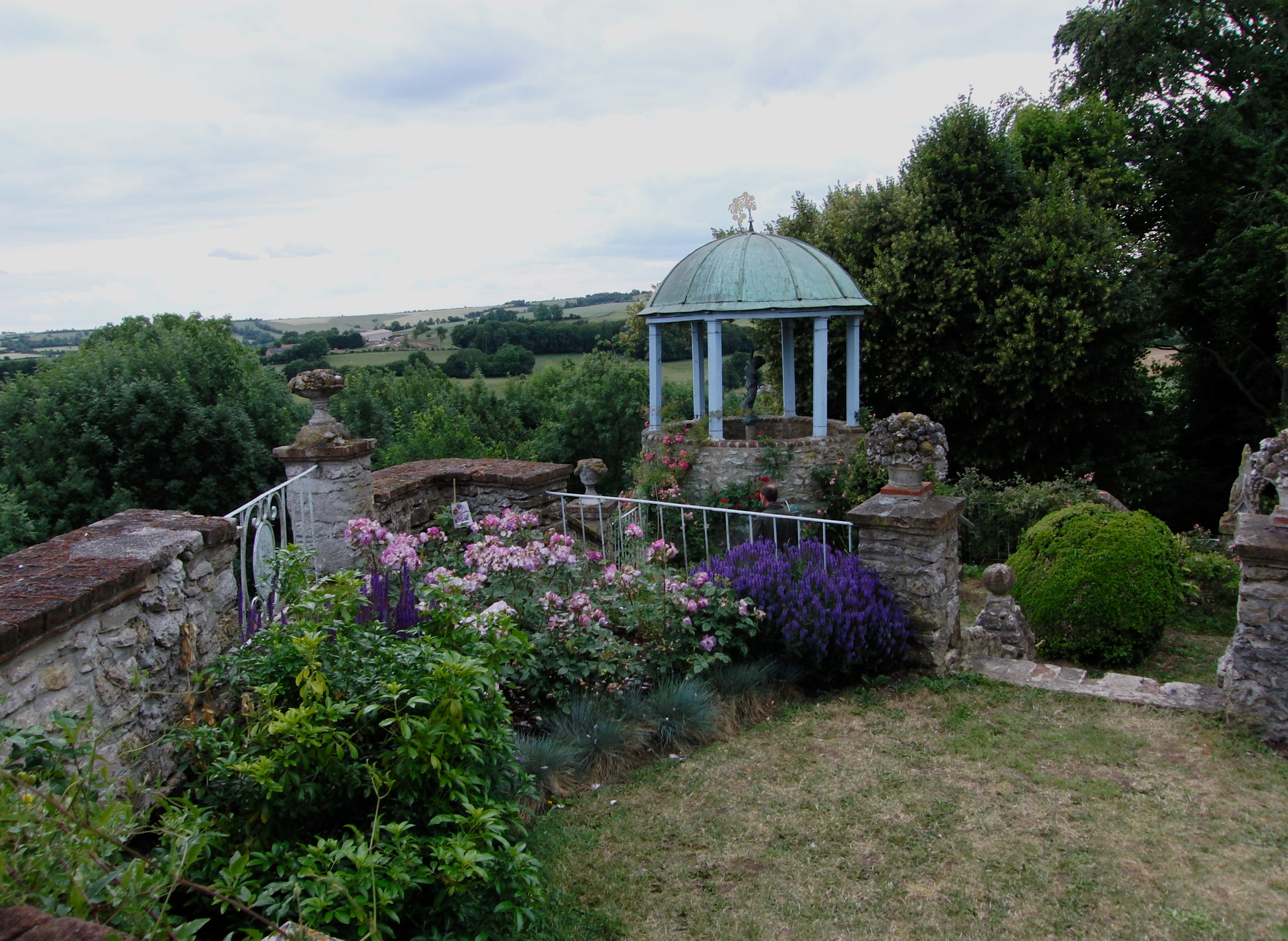

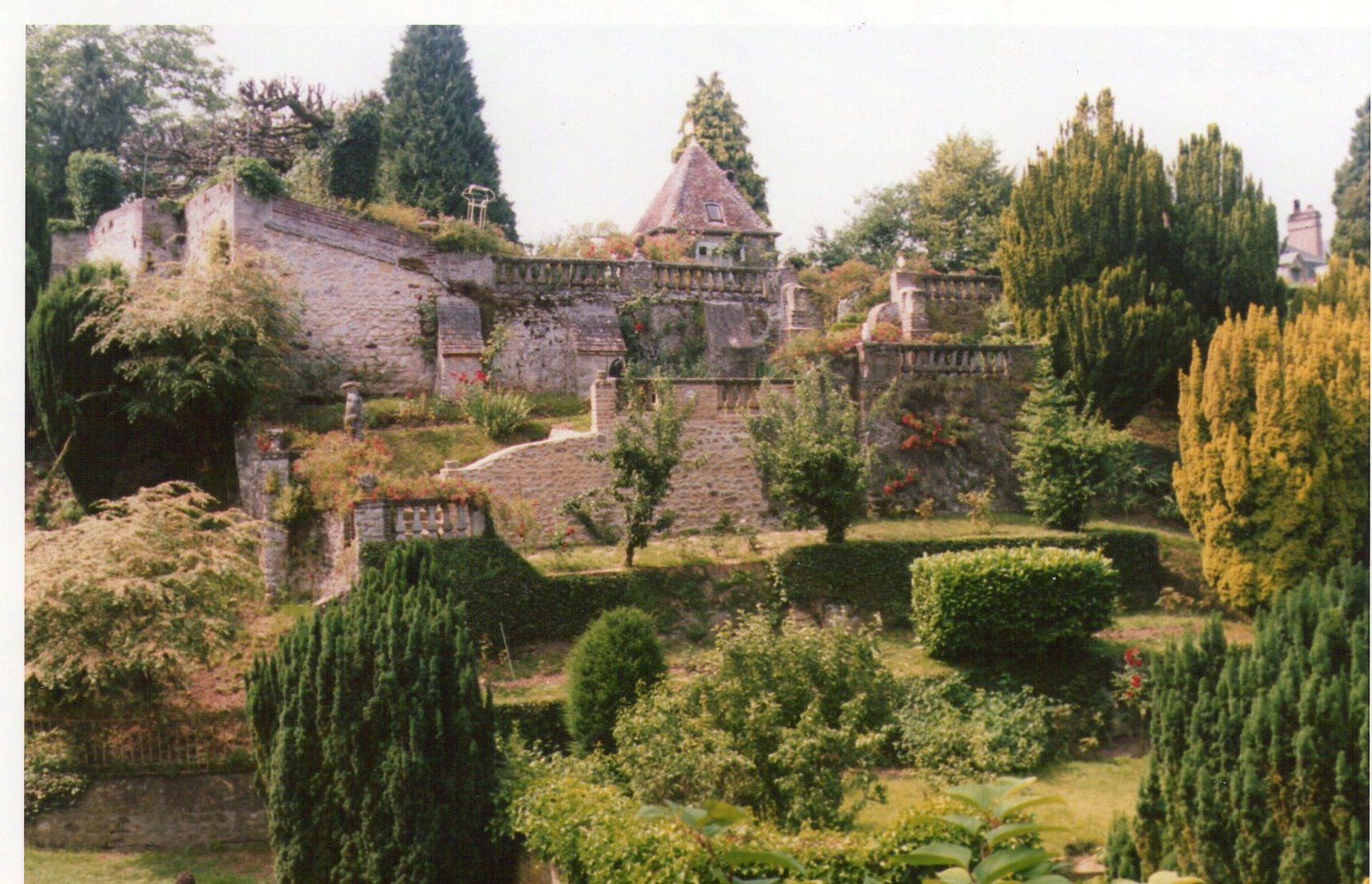

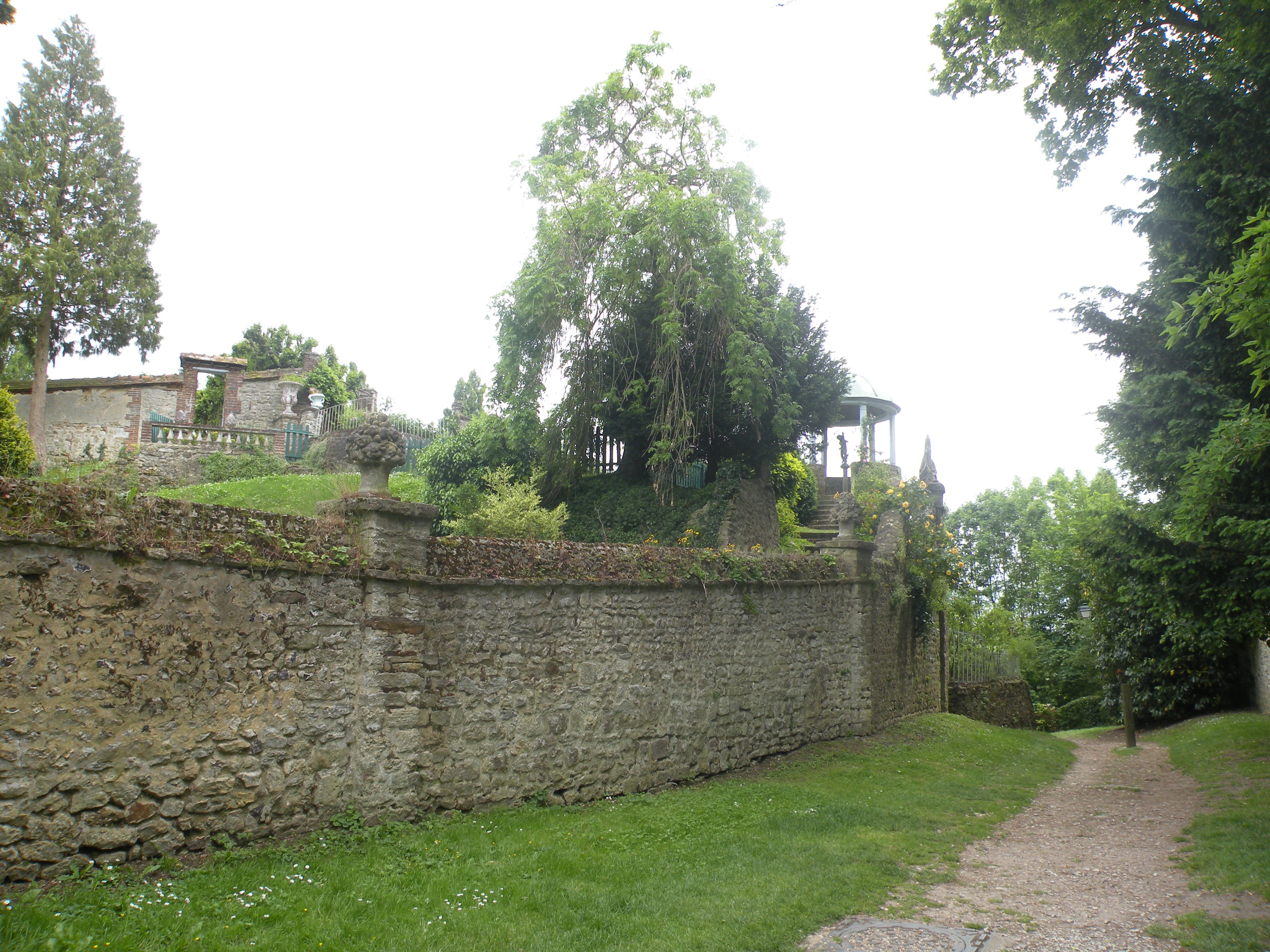

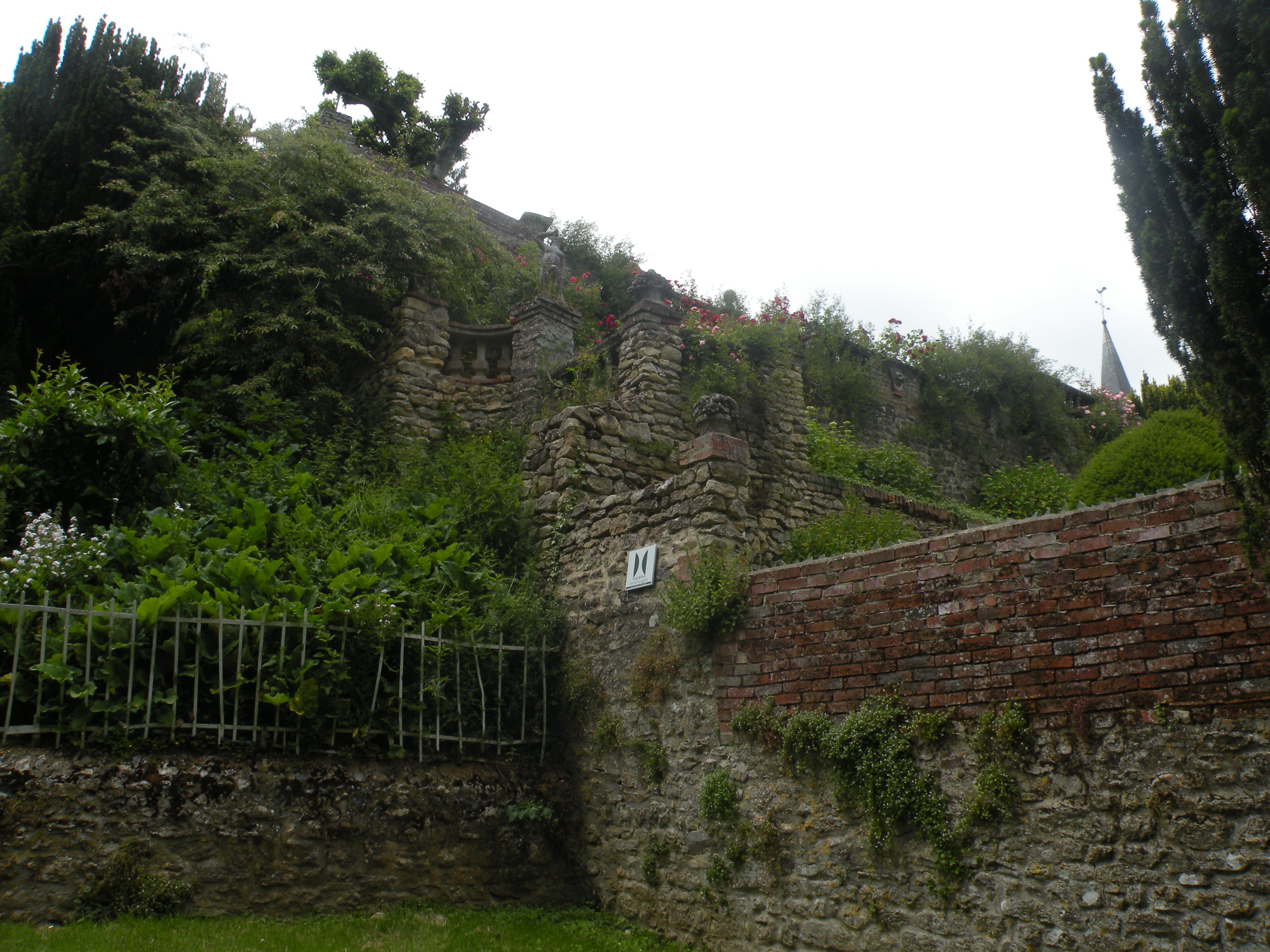

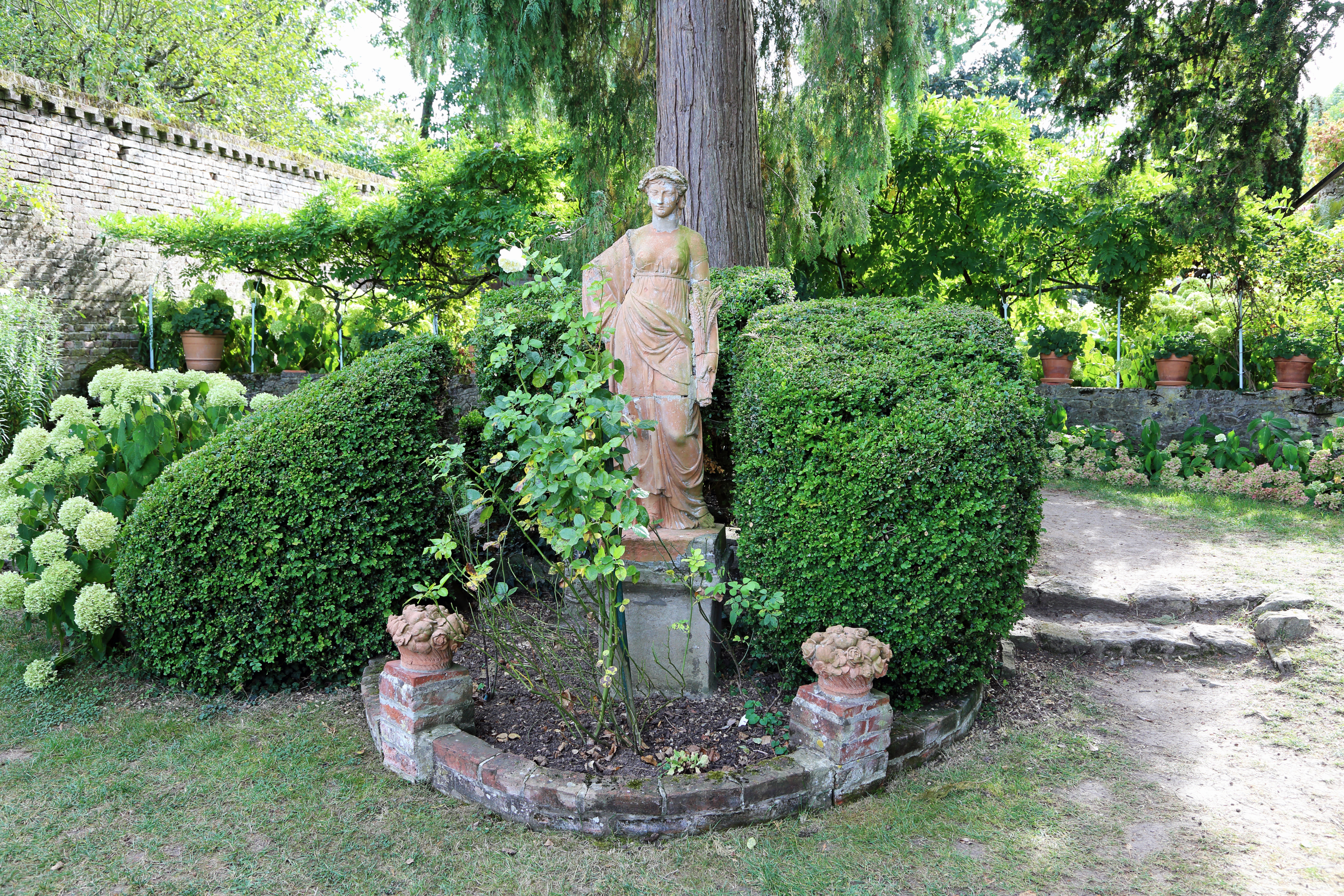
