= Veronica Bolay =

German-Irish painter

- Born: 8 August 1941; Hamburg, Germany
- Died: 3 January 2020 (aged 78); Blackrock, Dublin, Ireland
- Other name: Veronica Bolay-Jankowsky
- Education: University of Fine Arts of Hamburg; Aachen University
- Known for: oil painting, pastels
- Style: Intimism
- Spouse: Peter Jankowsky
- Children: 1
- Parent(s): Heinrich (Heiner) Bolay; Kate Bolay
- Elected: Royal Hibernian Academy (2002), Aosdána (2006)

Veronica Bolay RHA (8 August 1941 – 3 January 2020) was a German–Irish painter. She was a member of Aosdána, an elite Irish association of artists.

== Early life ==
Bolay was born in Hamburg in 1941. Her earliest memory was of Operation Gomorrah, the allied terror bombing of Hamburg. The family fled to Mecklenburg, then returned to Hamburg after hearing rumours that Mecklenburg would fall under Soviet control.

== Career ==
Bolay attended the University of Fine Arts of Hamburg in 1958–63, studying painting and costume design, as fine art was not considered a profitable career path. She then studied group therapy at Aachen University. In 1971 she moved to Ireland, and was part of a 1978 exhibition of women artists held in the Project Gallery in Dublin.

She was elected to the Royal Hibernian Academy in 2002 and to Aosdána in 2006.

Her work was in the field of abstract landscapes, working in oils and pastels, and often depicting the West of Ireland. The Irish Times wrote that "despite a bold colour sense [she] had an exceptionally light touch with both [oil and pastel], teasing out subtleties of light and atmosphere with expanses of radiant colour and darting lines. Even her quietest compositions are infused with a lively, crackling energy." Brian Fallon referred to her as an intimiste rather than a Romantic.

An exhibition of her work was shown at the Coach House Gallery, Dublin Castle in 2022–23. Paul Durcan wrote two poems inspired by her work.

== Personal life ==
Bolay married the Berlin-born actor Peter Jankowsky (1939–2014); they had one child. They lived in Westport, County Mayo and Stillorgan for much of their lives.

She died in 2020.
