= Angéline de Montbrun =

French-Canadian psychological novel by Laure Conan

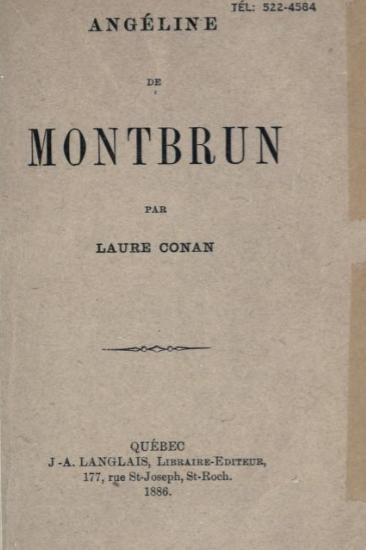
- Title page for Angéline de Montbrun (1886)
- Author: Laure Conan
- Translator: Yves Brunelle
- Language: French
- Genre: Psychological fiction
- Publication date: June 1881 – August 1882
- Publication place: Canada
- English publication date: 1974

Angéline de Montbrun is a novel written by Laure Conan. It was first published in La Revue canadienne in segments from June 1881 to August 1882 and published as a novel in 1884. It is considered one of the first French Canadian novels written by a woman and the first French Canadian psychological book.

The book tells the story of Angéline, a woman living with her father and becoming betrothed to a man named Maurice. When her father dies, and her face is disfigured in an accident, she breaks off her engagement and enters a period of self-isolation. She contemplates her life decisions and resolves at the end of the novel to live happily.

The novel explores themes of French-Canadian identity after the British conquest of Quebec. The novel was positively received by critics at the time of its publication.

== Plot ==
The plot concerns a woman named Angéline, who is raised by her father in an isolated village named Valriant. In the novel's first part, Maurice negotiates a marriage contract with Charles, Angéline's father. In the second part of the novel, Charles dies in a shooting accident and a fall disfigures Angéline's face. The engagement ends when Maurice's affection for Angéline decreases and Angéline renounces the world and enters a period of self-isolation. The third part of the novel concerns diary entries and letters in which Angéline recalls moments of her life with her father and Maurice. She expresses regret and agony over her decisions, processing her thoughts through writing. This contrasts with her friend, Mina, a worldly woman who becomes an Ursuline nun. Angéline visits her father's grave and burns her father's letters. She then writes a letter to Maurice, explaining that she will not be sad for the rest of her life.

== Characters ==
- Angéline de Montbrun: the main character who withdraws from society into a self-imposed isolation
- Charles de Montrun: Angéline's father.
- Maurice Darville: Angéline's fiancé
- Mina Darville: Maurice's sister and Angéline's friend

== Publication ==
The book was first published in La Revue canadienne as a serialised novel from June 1881–August 1882. Its positive reception caused Conan to seek someone who would publish the writings as a book. Abbé Paul Bruchési, one of her patrons, recommended that she contact Henri-Raymond Casgrain, who agreed to help promote the work. He praised the book in an article for the Quebec newspaper Le Courrier du Canada, asked his colleagues to write reviews of the work, and convinced Léger Brousseau to publish the book.

Casgrain wrote the preface to the novel and wanted to reveal Conan's real name in his writing. Conan refused, causing the two to cease contacting each other. The book was published in 1884.

The first English edition was published in 1974 and translated by Yves Brunelle. It was the first psychological novel written by a French Canadian and one of the first novels written by a French Canadian woman.

== Themes ==
The novel concerns the influence of religion in the life of families in the nineteenth century. The first two parts of the novel talk about current events in the lives of the characters and their human concerns. Before his death, her father replaces the human with the divine by imploring Angéline to seek sympathy from God after his death, breaking the marriage contract which stated that Maurice would comfort Angéline after Charles's death. While Maurice is briefly able to console Angéline, these effects are temporary and Angéline falls into despair. The third section of the novel expresses Angéline's struggle to replace her temporary human concerns with permanent divine consolations, eventually succeeding in this goal.

Angéline rebels against the characteristics of the conventional romantic woman and tries to join the sociopolitical aspects with her identity as a French Canadian woman. She references several French Canadian people to connect their artistic and political achievements with the feminist and psychology of Angeline.

The book shows the importance of nationalism, a common characteristic of roman du terroir novels. It explores French-Canadian's loss of national identity after being conquered by the British and unsuccessful rebellion in 1837 and 1838. Angéline's self-reflection is the author's proposal to have a political, feminist rebellion to change the structure of Quebec society and identity. Conan does not propose what the identity should be but wants French Canadians to stop relying on their French heritage to support their national identity. Angéline's discomfort with the societal limitations caused by her identity and events in her life are an allegory to the French Canadian discomfort with their standing in Canada. Angéline's diary entries, contemplating her death and an afterlife with her father, are supposed to give the reader a reflection of a future Quebec whose culture is able to prosper after British rule has ended. Conan's open-ended narrative gives choice to the reader to either hope for this future or to resign themselves to Quebec's oppressed cultural identity.

The structure of the novel has been described as "an apparent incoherent" by scholar David A. Powell. The first section contains letters between Angéline, Maurice, and Mina, who talk about the problems and events in the characters' lives. The second section of the novel contains diary entries and letters concerning Angéline's spiritual concerns.

== Reception ==
Critical reception at the time of its publication was positive.
