= Intimism (art movement) =

Art movement of paintings and drawings of quiet domestic scenes

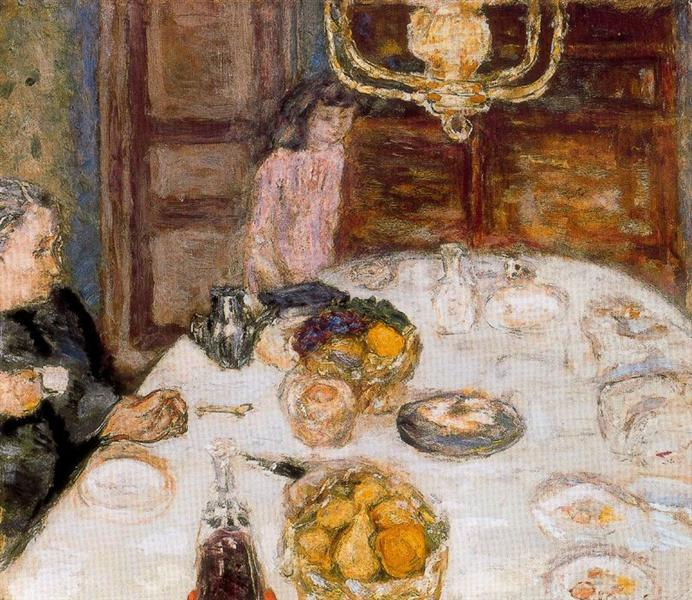
Lunch at Le Grand Lamps, Pierre Bonnard, 1899

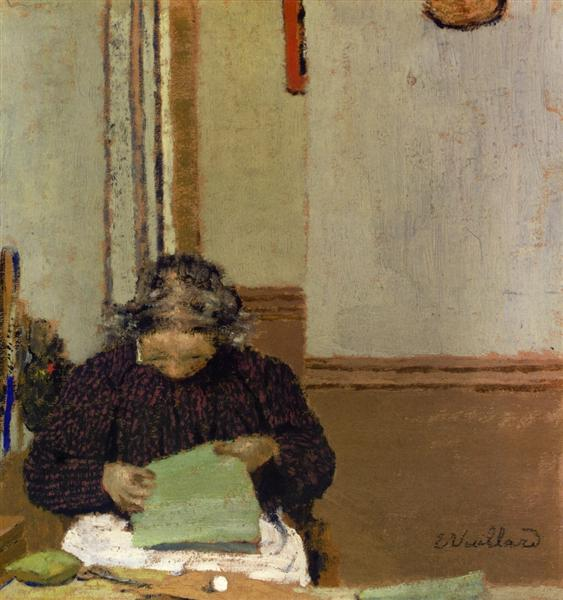
Madame Vuillard Cousant. Edouard Vuillard, 1895

Intimism (French: intimisme) was an artistic movement in the late 19th-century and early 20th-century that involved the depiction of banal yet personal domestic scenes, particularly those within domestic interiors. Intimism was most notably practiced by French painters Édouard Vuillard and Pierre Bonnard after the 1899 disbandment of Les Nabis. Edgar Degas and Felix Vallotton have also been characterized as intimists. The main interest of the intimists was their own intimate life such as portraying their family members instead of focusing on more general topics.

French art critic Camille Mauclair defined Intimism as:

a revelation of the soul through the things painted, the magnetic suggestion of what lies behind them through the description of the outer appearance, the intimate meaning of the spectacles of life

While the movement is often associated with Impressionism, the Intimists diverged from the Impressionists in abandoning a focus on formal accuracy in depiction of light, color, and perspective in favor of emphasized texture, exaggerated palette, and merged figure and ground.

The term "intimism" has since been extended to artists outside of the historical period who utilize similar techniques. Intimist film, for example, refers to cinema that utilizes domestic narratives or places focus on the mundane. Brian Fallon referred to Veronica Bolay as an intimiste. In a 2023 essay, curator Klaus Ottmann compared Honor Titus's portraits and scenes of everyday life to the "emotive, intimist quality" of paintings by Les Nabis.
