= Noire River =

Noire River or Rivière Noire may refer to:

== North America ==
- Grande rivière Noire or Big Black River (Saint John River tributary), in Maine, United States, and Quebec, Canada
- Noire River (L'Assomption River tributary), Matawinie, Lanaudière, Quebec, Canada
- Noire River (Ottawa River tributary), Waltham, Quebec, Canada
- Noire River (Beaurivage River tributary), Quebec, Canada
- Noire River (Bécancour River tributary), L'Érable, Centre-du-Québec, Quebec, Canada
- Noire River (Bulstrode River tributary), Arthabaska, Centre-du-Québec, Quebec, Canada
- Noire River (Felton River tributary), Le Granit, Estrie, Quebec, Canada
- Noire River (Fourche River tributary), Les Chenaux Regional County Municipality, Mauricie, Quebec, Canada
- Noire River (Huron River tributary), Lotbinière, Chaudière-Appalaches, Québec, Canada
- Noire River (rivière du Moulin tributary), Robert-Cliche, Chaudière-Appalaches, Quebec, Canada
- Noire River (Yamaska River tributary), Estrie and Montérégie, Quebec, Canada
- Little Black River (Saint John River tributary), flowing in Quebec (Canada) and Maine (USA)
- Noire River (Charlevoix), a tributary of the Saint Lawrence River in Quebec, Canada
- Noire River (Shawinigan), a tributary of the Saint-Maurice River in Shawinigan, Quebec, Canada
- Noire River (English River tributary), Haut-Saint-Laurent, Montérégie, Quebec, Canada
- Noire River (rivière de l'Esturgeon), Roussillon, Montérégie, Quebec, Canada
- Rivière Noire du Milieu, Mont-Élie, Charlevoix-Est, Capitale-Nationale, Quebec, Canada
- Rivière Noire Sud-Ouest, Monté-Élie, Charlevoix-Est, Capitale-Nationale, Quebec, Canada
- Noire River (rivière des Hurons), Stoneham-et-Tewkesbury, La Jacques-Cartier, Capitale-Nationale, Quebec, Canada
- Noire River (rivière aux Pommes), Portneuf RCM, Quebec, Canada
- Noire River (Montmorency River tributary), La Côte-de-Beaupré, Capitale-Nationale, Quebec, Canada
- Noire River (Prévost-Gilbert River tributary), Chaudière-Appalaches, Quebec, Canada
- Noire River (Sainte-Anne River), sub-basin of the Sainte-Anne river in Portneuf RCM, Quebec, Canada
- Rivière Noire or Little Black River (Saint John River tributary), in Quebec, Canada, and northern Maine, United States
- Rivière Noire du Milieu (Black River of the Middle), a tributary of the Noire River flowing in Mont-Élie in Charlevoix-Est Regional County Municipality, in Quebec
- Rivière Noire Sud-Ouest (Black River Southwest), a tributary of the Noire River flowing in Mont-Élie in Charlevoix-Est Regional County Municipality, in Quebec
- Noire River (Montmorency River), a tributary of the Montmorency River in Capitale-Nationale, Quebec, Canada

== Belgium ==
- Eau Noire river, tributary of the Meuse where Neptune Caves are located

== See also ==
- List of rivers of Quebec, including several called Noire River or Rivière Noire
- Black River (disambiguation)
