= Rivière à la Loutre (La Malbaie) =

Location
- Country: Canada
- Province: Quebec
- Region: Capitale-Nationale
- Regional County Municipality: Charlevoix-Est Regional County Municipality
- City: Saint-Siméon

Physical characteristics
- Source
  - location: La Malbaie
  - coordinates: 47.73346°N 70.03296°W
  - elevation: 317 m (1,040 ft)
- Mouth: St. Lawrence River
  - location: La Malbaie (sector of Bas-de-l'Anse)
  - coordinates: 47.6925°N 70.02944°W
  - elevation: 3 m (9.8 ft)
- Length: 5.8 km (3.6 mi)
- Discharge
  - location: La Malbaie

Basin features
- Tributaries
  - right: Ruisseau de la Fromagerie

The Loutre River is a tributary of the northwest shore of the St. Lawrence River, flowing into the town of La Malbaie, between the towns of Cap-à-l'Aigle and Saint-Fidèle, in the Charlevoix-Est Regional County Municipality, in the administrative region of Capitale-Nationale, in Quebec, in Canada. The course of this river flows into the St. Lawrence in the hamlet of Bas-de-l'Anse, northeast of the town of La Malbaie.

The valley of this watercourse is served by route 138 (Malcolm-Fraser Blvd.) which runs along the northwest shore of the St. Lawrence River and by route Sainte-Mathilde East.

Forestry is the main economic activity of the sector; recreational tourism activities (including resort and bed and breakfasts), second.

The surface of this stream is generally frozen from mid-December to late-March. Nevertheless, safe ice traffic is generally from late December to mid-March.

== Geography ==
The main hydrographic slopes near the "Loutre River" are:

- North side: Port au Persil River, Noire River, Port au Saumon River, Saguenay River;
- East side: St. Lawrence River;
- South side: St. Lawrence River;
- West side: Baptiste-Jean brook, Comporté River, Jacob River, Snigole River, Malbaie River.

The Loutre River originates from a small unidentified lake (length: 0.2 km (0.12 mi); altitude: 317 m (1,040 ft)) in forest area. From the mouth of this head lake, the course of the Loutre River descends by traveling 5.8 km (3.6 mi) according to the following segments:

- 1.0 km (0.62 mi) south by cutting a forest road to a bend in the river, corresponding to the confluence of a creek (coming from the east);
- 2.4 km (1.5 mi) south to a creek (coming from the east);
- 1.0 km (0.62 mi) southerly, bypassing the hamlet of Bas-de-Anse, to the bridge of route 138;
- 1.4 km (0.87 mi) southeasterly down the cliff in a forest area to the shore of the Gulf of St. Lawrence.

== Toponymy ==
The origin of the name "rivière à la Loutre" is related to the presence of otters in this area.

The toponym "rivière à la Loutre" was formalized on December 5, 1968 at the Bank of place names of the Commission de toponymie du Quebec.

== See also ==
- List of rivers of Quebec
