= Port aux Quilles River =

Location
- Country: Canada
- Province: Quebec
- Region: Capitale-Nationale
- Regional County Municipality: Charlevoix Regional County Municipality
- City: Saint-Siméon

Physical characteristics
- Source: Port aux Quilles Lake
  - location: Saint-Siméon
  - coordinates: 47.93851°N 69.94892°W
  - elevation: 173 m (568 ft)
- Mouth: St. Lawrence River
  - location: Saint-Siméon
  - coordinates: 47.94333°N 69.95444°W
  - elevation: 3 m (9.8 ft)
- Length: 15.5 km (9.6 mi)
- Discharge
  - location: Saint-Siméon

Basin features
- Tributaries
  - left: (from the mouth) Discharge of Arthur-Savard Lake, discharge of a set of lakes such Falaise Lake and Moustique Lake, discharge of lakes Henri, Rouge and Bleu, discharge of "lac à la Truite".
  - right: (from the mouth) Discharge of Ceci Lake, discharge of Épiphanie Lake.

The Port aux Quilles River is a tributary of the northwest shore of the St. Lawrence River flowing into the city of Saint-Siméon in the Charlevoix-Est Regional County Municipality, in the Capitale-Nationale administrative region, Quebec, Canada. The course of this river flows into the St. Lawrence River in the village of Port-aux-Quilles, northeast of the town of La Malbaie.

This small valley is served by the path of the "Lac du Port aux Quilles". The lower portion of this valley is served by route 138 along the northwest shore of the St. Lawrence River.

Forestry is the main economic activity of the sector; recreational and tourism activities (including resort and tourist activities), second.

The surface of this stream is usually frozen from mid-December to the end of March. Nevertheless, safe ice circulation is generally from late December to mid-March.

== Geography ==
The main hydrographic slopes near the "Port aux Quilles River" are:

- North side: Rivière de la Baie des Rochers, Saguenay River;
- East side: Anse à Poitras, St. Lawrence River;
- South side: Noire River, Port au Persil River, Port au Saumon River, Rivière à la Loutre (La Malbaie), Malbaie River;
- West side: Noire River.

The Port aux Quilles River rises at the mouth of Port aux Quilles Lake (altitude: 173 m (568 ft)) in the forest zone, at the foot of the Montagne de la Croix. On the outskirts of this lake, the resort is established around the eastern bay, near the mouth, because of the path of Port aux Quilles Lake which serves this area. From the mouth of Port aux Quilles Lake, the course of the Port aux Quilles River descends by traveling 15.5 km (9.6 mi) according to the following segments:

- 1.1 km (0.68 mi) southeasterly, crossing the Mare Lake to the outlet (coming from the north) of the Trout Lake;
- 2.9 km (1.8 mi) easterly collecting the dump (coming from the north) of Lakes Henri, Rouge et Bleu, to a bend in the river corresponding to the dump (coming from the north) of the Falaise lakes and Mosquito;
- 2.9 km (1.8 mi) south-easterly to the outlet (coming from the south) of Lac Épiphane, then east, forming several small streamers to the outlet of Lac Ceci (coming from South);
- 1.4 km (0.87 mi) northerly, forming a hook to the west, to the outlet of Lake Arthur-Savard (coming from the east);
- 3.6 km (2.2 mi) to the east, forming two successive curves towards the south, notably passing under Hydro-Québec's high-voltage lines, winding up to the confluence of a stream draining Lake Ennis (coming from the north). Note: This confluence is located just southwest of the center of the hamlet Port-aux-Quilles;
- 1.5 km (0.93 mi) southeasterly by cutting route 138 and collecting the Harvey Lake (from the southwest) discharge to the dump (coming from the northeast) of Seeds Lake;
- 2.1 km (1.3 mi) to the southeast crossing a series of rapids and waterfalls between two mountains, and collecting a stream (from the southwest) to the bottom of the "Anse de Port aux Quilles", which is open on the Gulf of St. Lawrence.

== Toponymy ==
The origin of the term "Port aux Quilles" remains unknown.

The toponym "Rivière du Port au Salum" was formalized on December 5, 1968 at the Bank of place names of the Commission de toponymie du Quebec.

== See also ==
- St. Lawrence River
- Saint-Siméon, a municipality
- List of rivers of Quebec
