= Saint-Siméon, Quebec =

Saint-Siméon, Quebec can refer to:

- Saint-Siméon, Gaspésie–Îles-de-la-Madeleine, in Bonaventure Regional County Municipality, Quebec
- Saint-Siméon, Capitale-Nationale, in Charlevoix-Est Regional County Municipality, Quebec
- Saint-Siméon, Quebec (designated place), a community in Saint-Siméon, Capitale-Nationale

== See also ==
- Saint-Simon, Quebec (disambiguation)
