= Rivière de la Baie des Rochers =

Rivière de la Baie du Rocher

Location
- Country: Canada
- Province: Quebec
- Region: Capitale-Nationale
- Regional County Municipality: Charlevoix Regional County Municipality
- City: Saint-Siméon

Physical characteristics
- Source: Baie aux Rochers Lake
  - location: Saint-Siméon
  - coordinates: 47.94867°N 69.90928°W
  - elevation: 200 m (660 ft)
- Mouth: St. Lawrence River
  - location: Saint-Siméon
  - coordinates: 47.95333°N 69.81223°W
  - elevation: 3 m (9.8 ft)
- Length: 9.9 km (6.2 mi)
- Discharge
  - location: Saint-Siméon

Basin features
- Tributaries
  - left: (from the mouth) Discharge of Gervais Lake
  - right: (from the mouth) Discharge of Lakes to Paul-Dufour, discharge of "Lac à Pitre", discharge of "Petit lac à Fidèle".

The Baie des Rochers River is a tributary of the northwest shore of the St. Lawrence River, flowing into the town of Saint-Siméon, in the Charlevoix-Est Regional County Municipality, in the Capitale-Nationale administrative region, Quebec, Canada. The course of this river goes through the village of Baie-des-Rochers before going to the Bay of Rochers, in the St. Lawrence River.

This small valley is served by the "rue des Tours" and "rue de la Chapelle"; these two roads connect together at route 138 which goes along the northwest shore of the St. Lawrence River and passes over the Baie des Rochers River at the village of Baie des Rochers.

Forestry is the main economic activity of the sector; recreational tourism activities (including resort and tourist activities), second.

The surface of this stream is generally frozen from mid-December to late-March. Nevertheless, safe ice traffic is generally from late December to mid-March.

== Geography ==
The main hydrographic slopes near the "Baie des Rochers river" are:

- North side: Saguenay River;
- East side: Baie des Rochers, St. Lawrence River;
- South side: Port aux Quilles River, Noire River, Port au Persil River, Port au Saumon River;
- West side: Petit Saguenay River.

The Baie des Rochers River rises at the mouth of Baie aux Rochers Lake (altitude: 200 m (660 ft)) in the forest zone. At the edge of this lake, the resort is established around the southeast bay, because of the secondary road that serves this area. From the mouth of Port aux Quilles Lake, the course of the Port aux Quilles River descends by traveling 9.9 km (6.2 mi) according to the following segments:

- 2.4 km (1.5 mi) to the north including crossing Long Lake (length: 2.1 km (1.3 mi); altitude: 184 m (604 ft)) over its full length, up to at its mouth;
- 1.3 km (0.81 mi) eastward, in particular, crossing the Écluse Lake (length: 0.7 km (0.43 mi); altitude: 129 m (423 ft)) and the Lake Carp, to the mouth of the latter. Note: the Écluse lake collects the waters of the Petit Lac Emmuraillé and the Petit Lac à Bec Croche from the north;
- 2.3 km (1.4 mi) easterly passing under high-voltage wires from Hydro-Québec and collecting the outlet of the lake at Pitre, to the bridge of route 138 to the village of Baie-des-Rochers;
- 3.9 km (2.4 mi) to the east by catching the landfill (coming from the north of Gervais lake) and crossing an area of rapids and waterfalls at the end of the route, to the bottom of Baie des Rochers which is open on the Gulf of St. Lawrence.

== Toponymy ==
This toponym refers to the rocks all around the bay and on "Baie des Rochers Island" which is located in the middle of the bay.

The toponym "Rivière de la Baie des Rochers" was formalized on December 5, 1968 at the Bank of place names of the Commission de toponymie du Quebec.

== See also ==
- St. Lawrence River
- Saint-Siméon, Capitale-Nationale, Quebec, a municipality
- Baie-des-Rochers, a village
- List of rivers of Quebec
