= Saint-Siméon, Capitale-Nationale (parish municipality) =

District in Canada

the parish municipality of Saint-Siméon (French pronunciation: [sɛ̃ simeɔ̃]) is a former parish municipality now part of the current regular municipality of Saint-Siméon, Quebec, Canada.

Prior to April 25, 2001, the parish of Saint-Siméon was an independent municipality; on that date, it and the village of Saint-Siméon were merged into the new municipality of Saint-Siméon.

== History ==
The parish was founded in 1869 by separating from Saint-Étienne-de-Murray-Bay. In 1911, the more urban sector split to became the village municipality of Saint-Siméon. Those two territories were then merged one again, in 2001, for the creation of the current Saint-Siméon.

== Demographics ==
Historical census populations – Saint-Siméon Parish (1869–2001)

Year	Pop.	±%
1921	667	—
1931	643	−3.6%
1941	728	+13.2%
1951	704	−3.3%
1956	697	−1.0%
1961	663	−4.9%
1966	730	+10.1%

Year	Pop.	±%
1971	644	−11.8%
1976	622	−3.4%
1981	608	−2.3%
1986	610	+0.3%
1991	519	−14.9%
1996	477	−8.1%
2001	468	−1.9%

Population counts are not adjusted for boundary changes.
Source: Statistics Canada
