= Île aux Lièvres =

Île aux lièvres (English: Hare Island) may refer to:

- Île aux Lièvres (Saint Lawrence River), an island in Saint-André, Quebec, Canada
- Île aux Lièvres (Richelieu River), an island in Carignan, Quebec, Canada
