= Rivière Noire Sud-Ouest =

River in Canada

Rivière Noire Sud-Ouest (Noire River of South-West)
- Location within Quebec

Location
- Country: Canada
- Province: Quebec
- Region: Capitale-Nationale
- Regional County Municipality: Charlevoix-Est Regional County Municipality
- Unorganized territory: Mont-Élie

Physical characteristics
- Source: Julie Lake
  - location: Mont-Élie
  - coordinates: 47.83528°N 70.21072°W
  - elevation: 729 m (2,392 ft)
- Mouth: Noire River
  - location: Mont-Élie
  - coordinates: 47.9025°N 70.04166°W
  - elevation: 170 m (560 ft)
- Length: 27.9 km (17.3 mi)
- Discharge
  - location: Mont-Élie

Basin features
- Tributaries
  - left: Décharge des lacs à Clément, des Becs-Scie et à la Truite, décharge des lacs à Rochette, Harp, à Beaulieu et du Garde.
  - right: Décharge du Lac McLeod.

The Rivière Noire Sud-Ouest (Black River Southwest) is a tributary of the south shore of the Noire River flowing, entirely in the unorganized territory from Mont-Élie in Charlevoix-Est Regional County Municipality, in Quebec, Canada.

The lower part of this valley is served by route 170 which links Saint-Siméon to Petit-Saguenay, which passes on the north shore of the Noire River. This valley has some secondary forest roads for forestry and recreational tourism purposes.

Forestry is the first economic activity in the sector; recreational tourism activities, second.

The surface of "rivière Noire Sud-Ouest" is usually frozen from the beginning of December to the end of March, however, safe ice circulation is generally from mid-December to mid-March.

== Geography ==
The main hydrographic slopes near the Black River are:

- North side: Noire River, Petit Saguenay River, rivière Noire du Milieu, Saguenay River;
- East side: Noire River, St. Lawrence River;
- South side: Port au Persil River, Port au Saumon River, Comporté River, Malbaie River, Jacob River;
- West side: American Creek, Castors Creek, Malbaie River, Snigole River.

The "rivière Noire Sud-Ouest" originates at the mouth of Julie Lake (length: 0.3 km (0.19 mi); altitude: 729 m (2,392 ft)). This source is located at:

- 14.7 km (9.1 mi) south-west of its mouth (confluence with Black River);
- 25.2 km (15.7 mi) south-west of the mouth of the Black River with the Gulf of St. Lawrence;
- 4.7 km (2.9 mi) southeast of the head lake of the Petit Saguenay River;
- 10.4 km (6.5 mi) north-east of the hamlet Mont-Grand-Fonds.

From its source (Lake Julie), the course of the "rivière Noire Sud-Ouest" descends on 27.9 km (17.3 mi) according to the following segments:

Upper South-West Black River (segment: 18.4 km (11.4 mi))

- 0.5 km (0.31 mi) south, crossing the Cure Lake (length: 0.5 km (0.31 mi); altitude: 728 m (2,388 ft)) on 0.4 km (0.25 mi) to its mouth;
- 3.6 km (2.2 mi) east to the Hydro-Québec high-voltage lines;
- 4.7 km (2.9 mi) northeasterly along the west side of a forest road and passing south-east of the hamlet "Les Jardins" to a creek (coming from the west);
- 1.1 km (0.68 mi) northeasterly to the forest road bridge;
- 3.4 km (2.1 mi) northeasterly, passing southeast of Lac au Plongeon, to the bridge of the forest road;
- 2.8 km (1.7 mi) northeasterly to a bend in the river;
- 2.3 km (1.4 mi) south-east approaching the foot of the Mountain at Meniche, to a bend of river;

Lower South-West Black River (segment: 9.5 km (5.9 mi))

- 1.9 km (1.2 mi) north to a creek (coming from the west);
- 4.5 km (2.8 mi) snaking north, collecting the discharge (coming from the southwest) of McLeod Lake and the discharge (coming from the west) of a set of small lakes, up to a stream (coming from the west);
- 3.1 km (1.9 mi) first forming a hook to the east, then successively to the north, to the west, and to the north where it descends from 100 m (330 ft) to its mouth.

The mouth of the Black Southwest River empties onto the south shore of the Black River in Mont-Élie. This confluence is located at:

- 13.9 km (8.6 mi) east of the mouth of the Noire River with the Gulf of St. Lawrence;
- 30.6 km (19.0 mi) south of the Saguenay River;
- 15.25 km (9.48 mi) north of the hamlet Mont-Grand-Fonds.

== Toponymy ==
The origin of the name "Rivière Noire Sud-Ouest" is derived from the name of the Noire River in which it flows.

The toponym "rivière Noire Sud-Ouest" was formalized on December 5, 1968 at the Bank of place names of the Commission de toponymie du Quebec.

== See also ==
- Mont-Élie, an unorganized territory
- St. Lawrence River
- Noire River, a watercourse
- List of rivers of Quebec
