= Noire River (Shawinigan) =

Location
- Country: Canada
- Province: Quebec
- Region: Mauricie
- City: Shawinigan
- Sector: Saint-Georges-de-Champlain

Physical characteristics
- Source: Stream draining a marsh area
  - location: Hérouxville
  - coordinates: 46.684454°N 72.623578°W
  - elevation: 143 m (469 ft)
- Mouth: Saint-Maurice River
  - location: Shawinigan (sector Saint-Georges-de-Champlain)
  - coordinates: 46.63194°N 72.66278°W
  - elevation: 115 m (377 ft)
- Length: 7.8 km (4.8 mi)

Basin features
- Progression: Saint-Maurice River, Saint Lawrence River
- Tributaries
  - right: (upstream) Branche Trahan, cours d'eau Duchesne

The Rivière Noire (English: Black River) is a tributary of the east bank of the Saint-Maurice River, flowing south on 3.6 kilometres (2.2 mi) in the territory of Hérouxville from the MRC Mékinac and south-west on 4.2 kilometres (2.6 mi) in Shawinigan (Saint-Georges-de-Champlain sector), in the administrative region of Mauricie, in Quebec, in Canada.

== Geography ==
The Black River draws its sources from a wetland located a few hundred meters north of rang Saint-Pierre-Nord road and from various agricultural streams located west of route 153, west of the village of Hérouxville. In particular, it drinks from the Duchesne stream (located 5.2 kilometres (3.2 mi) from the confluence).

The river flows a priori towards the south in Hérouxville, then enters the territory of the old village municipality of Saint-Georges (today a sector of the city of Shawinigan). Then the river slants to the southwest passing near the Garneau-Jonction train station. It then crosses the Saint-Georges-de-Champlain sector, recovering water, in particular from the "Trahan branch" at 1.9 kilometres (1.2 mi) from its mouth. In short, the river flows in parallel (on the west side) to the [Canadian National] railway and to route 153.

The waters flow into a long bay which forms an appendix to the artificial reservoir generated by the hydroelectric dam erected on the Saint-Maurice River, in the Saint-Georges-de-Champlain sector of the town of Shawinigan. A municipal gazebo has been built on the south shore of this narrow bay.

== Toponymy ==
The Black River toponym was formalized on December 5, 1968 at the Place Names Bank of the Commission de toponymie du Québec.

== Appendices ==
=== Related articles ===
- Hérouxville, municipality
- Mékinac Regional County Municipality
- Saint-Georges-de-Champlain, sector of Shawinigan
- Shawinigan, city
- Saint-Maurice River
- Mauricie
- List of rivers of Quebec
