= Port au Persil River =

Location
- Country: Canada
- Province: Quebec
- Region: Capitale-Nationale
- Regional County Municipality: Charlevoix-Est Regional County Municipality
- City: Saint-Siméon

Physical characteristics
- Source: Mountain creek
  - location: La Malbaie
  - coordinates: 47.84656°N 69.94444°W
  - elevation: 281 m (922 ft)
- Mouth: St. Lawrence River
  - location: Saint-Siméon
  - coordinates: 47.80611°N 69.90028°W
  - elevation: 3 m (9.8 ft)
- Length: 9.4 km (5.8 mi)
- Discharge
  - location: Saint-Siméon

Basin features
- Tributaries
  - left: Cours d’eau Savard,
  - right: Ruisseau du Canton

The Port au Persil River (French: "Rivière du Port au Persil") is a tributary of the northwest shore of the St. Lawrence River, flowing into the city of Saint-Siméon in the Charlevoix-Est Regional County Municipality, in the Capitale-Nationale administrative region, Quebec, Canada. The course of this river flows into the Saint Lawrence River in the village of Port au Persil, northeast of the city of La Malbaie.

The upper part of the valley of this watercourse is served by Route 138 along the northwest shore of the St. Lawrence River. However, this road spans the river from Port aux Persil to land in order to get around the coast near the river. The riparian zone is served by the Port-au-Persil road which spans the Port-au-Persil River, near its confluence with the Gulf of St. Lawrence.

Forestry is the main economic activity of the sector; recreational and tourism activities (including resort and tourist activities), second.

The surface of this stream is usually frozen from mid-December to the end of March. Nevertheless, safe ice circulation is generally from late December to mid-March.

== Geography ==
The main hydrographic slopes near the "Salmon Port River" are:

- North side: Noire River, Port aux Quilles River, Rivière de la Baie des Rochers, Saguenay River;
- East side: Port aux Persil Cove, St. Lawrence River;
- South side: Marguerite Creek, Port au Saumon River, Rivière à la Loutre, Malbaie River;
- West side: Salmon Port River.

The Port-au-Persil River rises from a mountain stream (elevation: 281 m (922 ft)) in a forest area southeast of "lac des Rats Musqués" (lake of the Musk Rats).

From its source, the course of the Port aux Persil river descends by traveling 9.4 km (5.8 mi) according to the following segments:

- 3.0 km (1.9 mi) southeasterly, to a bend in a river where a stream flows (from the north);
- 2.9 km (1.8 mi) to the south, in particular passing under Hydro-Québec power lines, then to the east, winding up to Route 138 that it cuts at 0.4 km (0.25 mi) north of the hamlet Saint-Chrétien;
- 1.5 km (0.93 mi) south to a river bend where a stream flows (from the west);
- 2.0 km (1.2 mi) east through a series of rapids and waterfalls, to the east shore of Port Anse à Persil which is interelected in the Gulf of St. Lawrence.

== Toponymy ==
The term "Port au Persil" is used in Quebec toponymy in the area of Saint-Siméon to designate: the harbor, the hamlet, the bay, the road, the lake, the river and a street.

The term "parsley" was used in the accounts of Samuel de Champlain in 1626. The word parsley is equivalent to "Ligusticum scothicum" or Scottish fillet or parsley or wild parsley, which abound on the shores of the St. Lawrence River, particularly at Rivière-du-Loup.

The toponym "Rivière du Port au Saumon" was formalized on March 28, 1974 at the Bank of Place Names of the Commission de toponymie du Québec.

== See also ==
- St. Lawrence River
- Saint-Siméon, a municipality
- List of rivers of Quebec
