= Cap-à-l'Aigle =

Geographic area in Quebec, Canada

Coordinates: 47.663°N 70.106°W

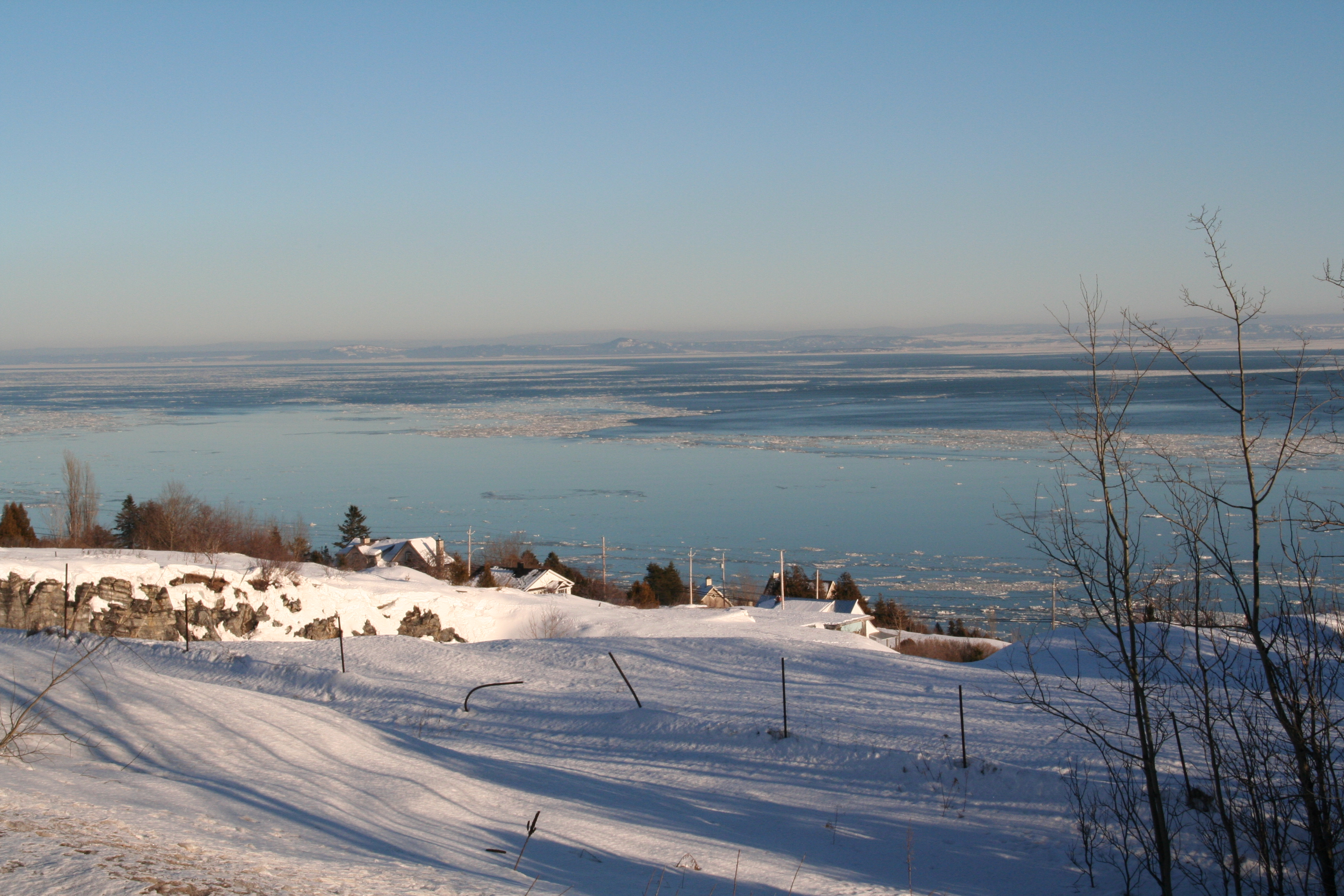
La Malbaie City, Cap-à-l'Aigle sector, from Route 138

Cap-à-l'Aigle, a town village in La Malbaie, stretches lengthwise on the plateau overlooking the middle estuary of the St. Lawrence River, in the Capitale-Nationale region, regional municipality of Charlevoix-Est, Quebec, Canada.

Since 1999, the municipality of Cap-à-l'Aigle has been part of the grouping of Rivière-Malbaie, Saint-Fidèle, Sainte-Agnès and the city of La Malbaie–Pointe-au-Pic, which have since formed the city of La Malbaie.

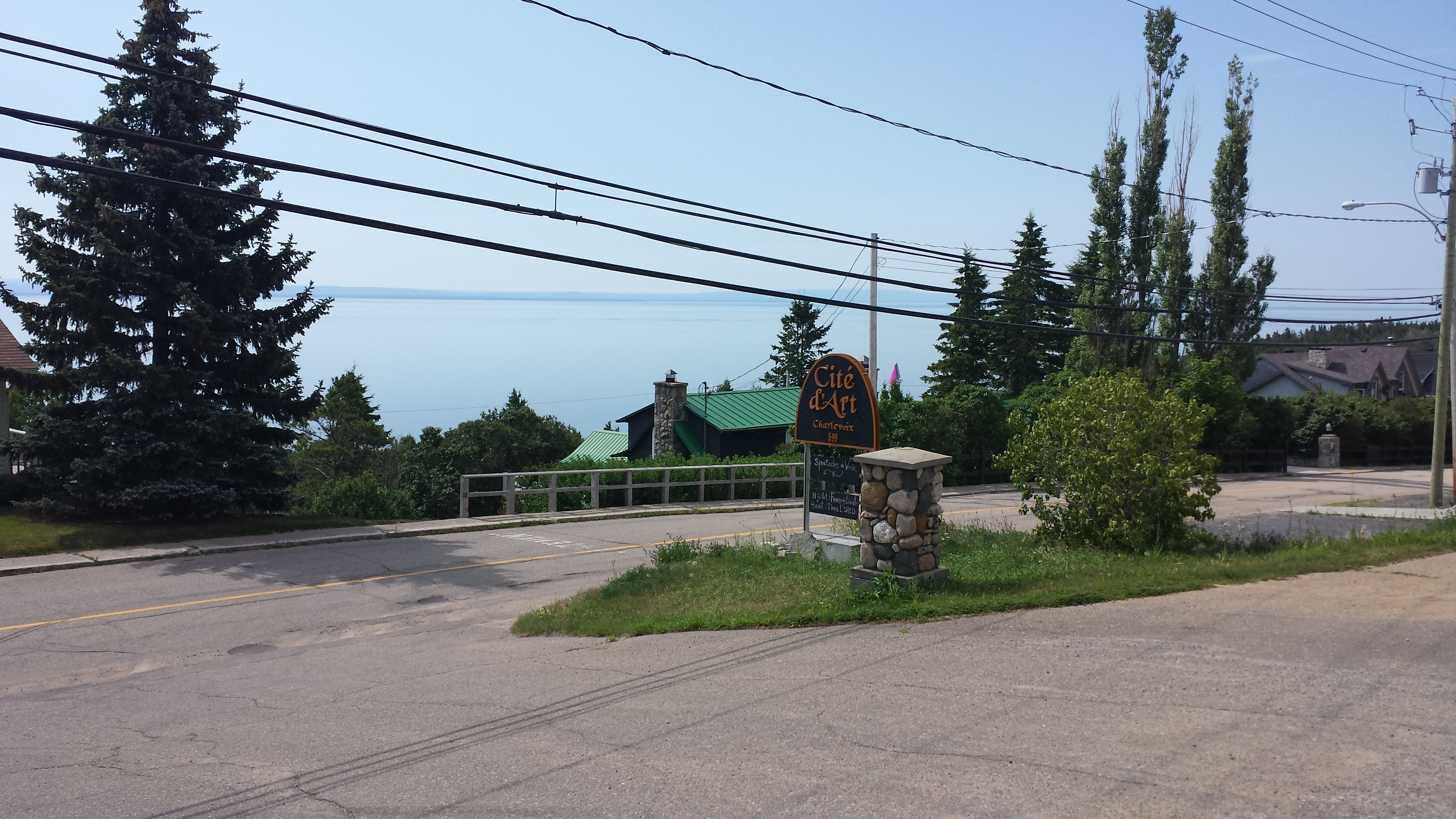
La Malbaie City, eastern entrance of Cap-à-l'Aigle sector

Cap-à-l'Aigle protects its culture, charms and built heritage, and many of the largest inns and best restaurants in Charlevoix are located here.

In spring, the landscape transforms with the omnipresence of lilac.

== Horticulture ==
Gardens of Les Quatre Vents and Lilac Gardens.

Developed and enlarged by Francis Higginson Cabot (1925–2011), the Gardens of Les Quatre Vents are considered a notable site to visit in Cap-à-l'Aigle. The Gardens of Les Quatre Vents work with the mission of Centre Écologique de Port-au-Saumon to raise awareness in natural sciences and the environment "from the starfish to the shooting star."

Thanks to journalist Denis Gauthier and Mayor Bruno Simard, the "lilac garden" of Cap-à-l'Aigle was created in 1997 and the development work began in 2002. To give a leverage to this horticultural complex Konrad Kircher, a horticulturist of German origin, has donated a rare collection of more than 1,000 lilacs to this non-profit organization. Visitors can discover in this garden this collection of plants that includes more than 200 varieties.

This typical garden is structured in four large thematic groups: Garden, Memorial Garden, Traditional Vegetable Garden and The Big Willow. The garden also includes many flowerbeds filled with perennials and annuals. There is also the Pavillon Duchesne, a café-terrace "Le Lilas Café" overlooking the river, a souvenir shop and the barn where artisans present their works. The entire horticultural landscape is part of the territory of the World Biosphere Reserve.

Gardens of Quatre-Vents

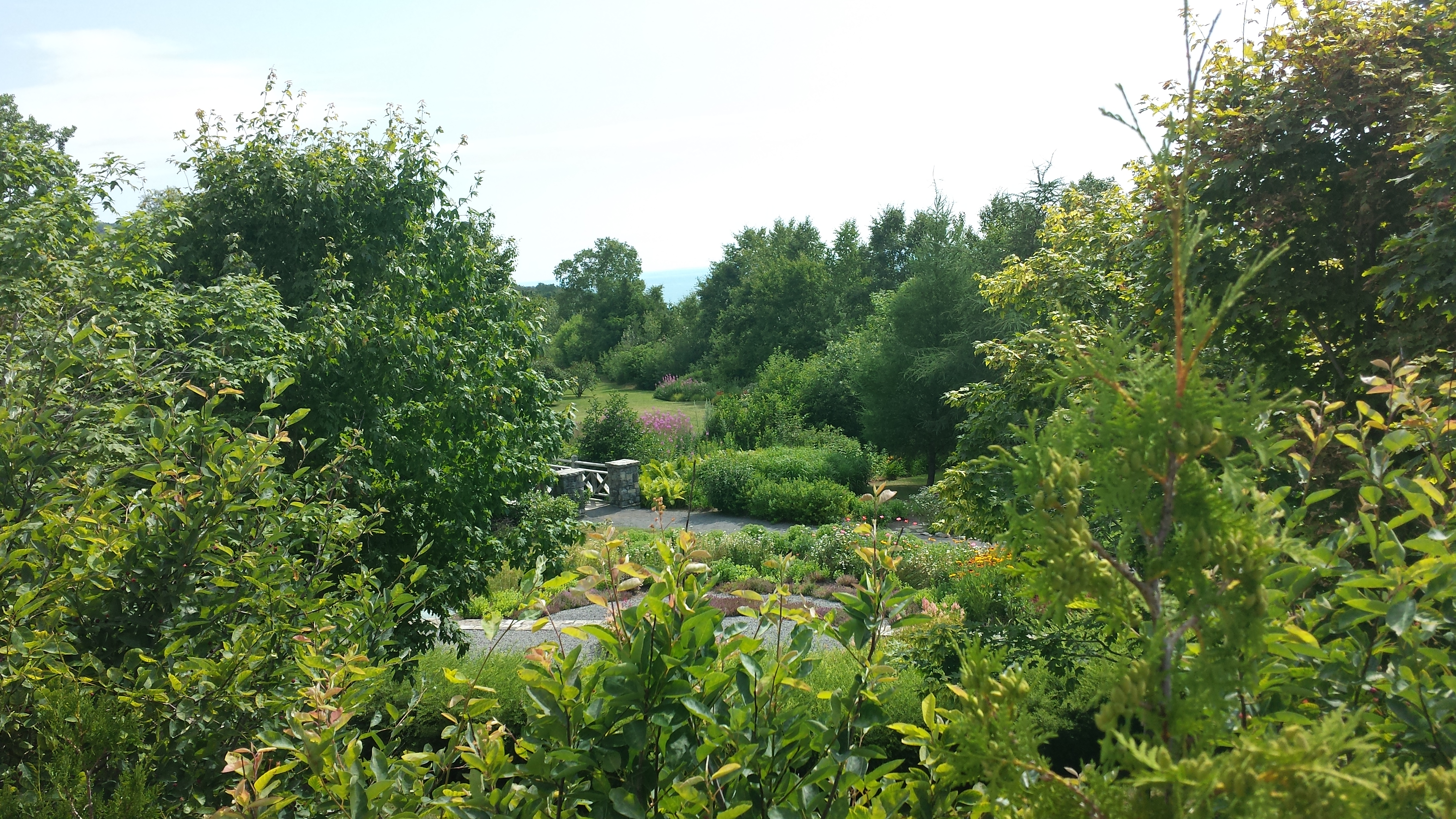
View of the old gardens from the main road.

The philanthropist Francis H. Cabot realized in Cap-à-l'Aigle, the magnificent Jardins de Quatre-Vents. Dedicated to horticulture, he served as Treasurer of the American Rock Garden Society and served as Chairman of the New York Botanical Garden. Annually, from June to August, the gardens open their doors four times, on Saturdays.

Arranged for more than 70 years, the Jardins de Quatre-Vents covers more than eight hectares. Visitors can discover more than 1000 plant species. Boasting a maritime climate, this garden is listed among the largest contemporary private gardens.

The site also has a mansion. The architecture of the farm buildings is associated with old styles of construction of New France, similar to those of the old Europe. The garden includes a dovecote and a Japanese bridge. The evocative designations such as Allée des Oies make this site unique and distinctive in the world. In his book "An Extraordinary Garden", intended for horticulture enthusiasts, the horticulturist Jean des Gagniers retraces the major stages of the evolution of the "Gardens of Quatre-Vents".

According to a long tradition, horticulture enthusiasts rub shoulders with each other in Cap-à-l'Aigle, known as the "Village des Lilas" (Village of lilacs), to the delight of residents and visitors alike. In solidarity, the residents of Saint-Raphaël Street planted lilacs on the flowerbeds around their homes or around the many inns and lodges for visitors. While walking on the main street of Cap-à-l'Aigle, visitors can admire the authentic landscaped landscaping of this village.

The residents of the village are particularly fond of lilac flowers. Annually, the village turns to the party under the theme "The time of lilacs", celebrated the second weekend of June. During this annual lilac festival, Saint-Raphaël Street becomes the center of attraction for visitors where they meet musicians and artists.

The architectural heritage of Saint-Raphaël Street includes buildings of great historical value, such as the Bherer barn with its thatched roof and the St. Peter-on-the-Rock Anglican Church. Along the main street of the village, information boards inform visitors about the local heritage, allowing them to make a self-guided tour of the village.

== Geography ==
The distance between the beginning of the village of Cap-à-l'aigle (the intersection of Saint-Raphael Street and Route 138) and the bridge at the mouth of the Malbaie River in the city from La Malbaie, is 2.5 km (1.6 mi). The village of Cap-à-l'aigle is bypassed on the north side by route 138 (Malcom Fraser Boulevard) along the north shore of the St. Lawrence River. This village is mostly built along the rue Saint Raphael which is the main street; a few perpendicular little streets lead to the strike.

The village dominates the Estuary of St. Lawrence River, being located at the top of a long cliff, allowing to admire the panorama fluvial whose mountainous coast Pointe-au-Pic, which constitutes the western sector from La Malbaie.

The Sainte-Mathilde road, which delimits the Sainte-Mathilde range, located about one kilometer north, parallel to route 138, is worth the detour. This paronic road has many coasts, due to erosion by streams running down the mountains. This row consists of several houses and farm buildings typical of the beginning of the XXe century. Agricultural producers in this area practice hill-side agriculture. The eastern segment of the road is a cul-de-sac that ends at the top of the mountain where a telecommunication antenna is installed.

== Port and marina ==
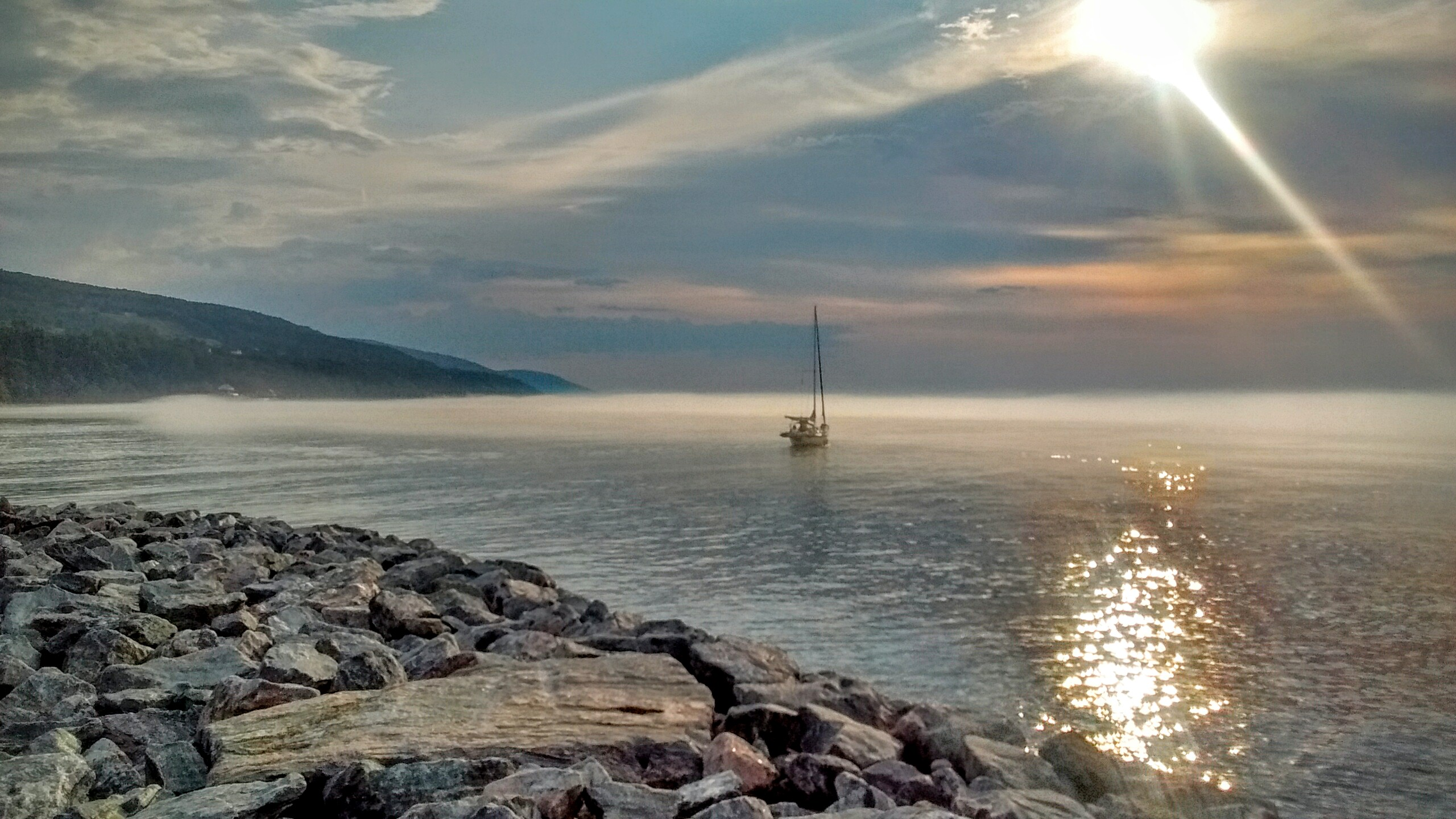
Cap-à-l'Aigle La Malbaie Québec Canada

Sunset on the St. Lawrence River, in front of Cap-à-l'Aigle and the marina, protected by a high pier of large stones, are located in front of the village, near a strike. Sailors frequent the marina all summer because it is well located between Tadoussac and Baie-Saint-Paul. Annually, during the Labor Day weekend, the Cap-à-l'Aigle Marina closes the sailing season in Quebec with a major nautical event. Every weekend before Labor Day, sailing events are held in Quebec including the Triangle Race, the Crescent-Price Cup and the Edmond Desgagnés Challenge.

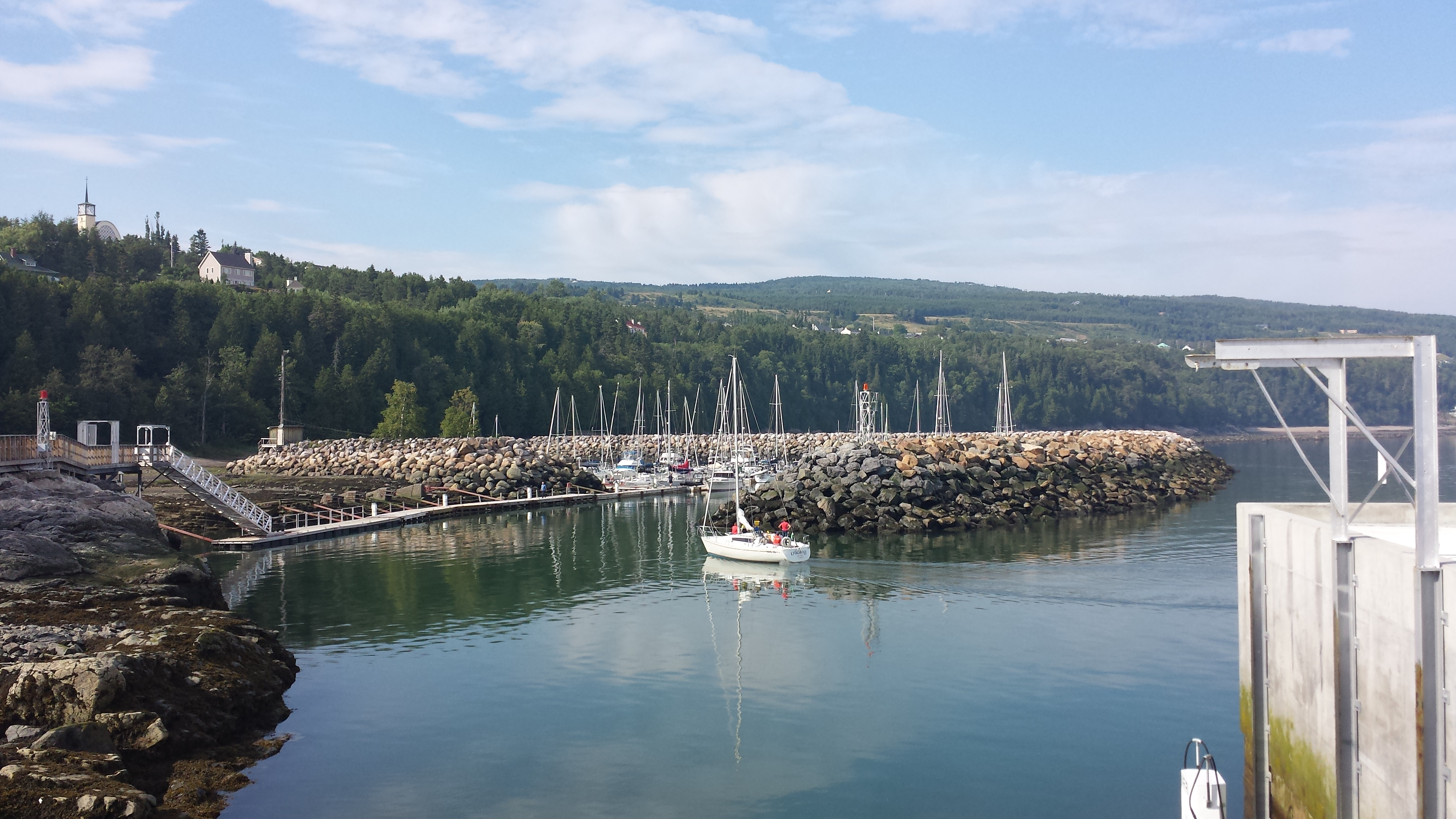
Entrance to the Cap-à-l'Aigle Marina.

Since about 2004, the Cap-à-l'Aigle federal wharf was unused, being heavily damaged by the wear and tear of the St. Lawrence River. Pedestrians and osmerus fishermen had partial accessibility to this wharf, which partially serves as a breakwater at the nearby marina. In the summer of 2014, rockfill work on the Petit Quai de Cap-à-l'Aigle aimed to preserve the structure of the wharf, but condemned it for the boarding of ships. Located just five kilometers upstream on the river, Pointe-au-Pic wharf offers better deep-water mooring characteristics for cruise ships and merchant vessels. In 2013, the federal government transferred its rights to the Charlevoix Transportation Infrastructure Management Corporation (SOGIT), which owns the Cap-à-l'Aigle and Pointe-au-Pic docks.

== Toponymy ==
The toponym "Cap-à-l'Aigle" is associated with a rocky cape with a height of 60 m (200 ft) overlooking the North Shore of the St. Lawrence River. The village of Cap-à-l'Aigle was formed at the top of this cape and extends over a series of rocky cliffs on the north shore of the St. Lawrence River

According to the Commission de toponymie du Québec, in 1685, the said cape was designated "Le Heu". In 1608, Samuel de Champlain attributed to present-day Mount Remous in Saint-Fidèle (located 10 km northeast of the current village of Cap-à-l'Aigle), the designation of Cape to Eagle (modern maps designate "Gros Cap-à-l'Aigle"); it is a land advance of 228 m in height and more extensive. However, Samuel de Champlain would have made a mistake in locating this "cape at L'Aigle" by locating it 8 leagues (24 miles or 38 km) from Salmon Head; the distance is about 2 leagues (about 6 miles or 11 km).

This could be an editing error, since Samuel de Champlain's estimate of the distance between the current Port-aux-Quilles (now a sector of the municipality of Saint-Siméon (Charlevoix-Est)) and the cape Salmon is rigorously exact. In this respect, in 1993, Louis Pelletier raises the hypothesis that this course, mentioned by Samuel de Champlain, while not corresponding to the course of the current Eagle, can not be precisely located.

On a cartographic document drawn around 1641, Jean Bourdon identifies a "cape à l'Aigle" which corresponds to the location of "Gros cap à l'Aigle", located much further to the east, as mentioned in 1824 by Georges Duberger. The English forms Cape Eagle and Eagle's Cape appear frequently in cartographic documents of the 18th and 19th century.

In the course of history, the name "Cap à l'Aigle" has been associated with several toponymic names of this region: a small and a large rocky cape, a concession, a rank, a village, a municipality, a cove (between 1800 and 1814) and an area of La Malbaie. In the first half of the 19th century, the designation "Cap-à-l'Aigle" applied by borrowing to the current rocky natural course. By popular usage, this toponymic designation was probably derived from the appellations of the Cape to the Ancient Eagle or the current Gros Cap à l'Aigle.

Several rocky capes of Charlevoix on the north shore of the St. Lawrence River are designated by bird names including: cape crows, goose cape and cape crows, Cap-à-l'Aigle (small) and Gros-Cap -to-the Eagle. These sea capes are natural landmarks for navigation and refuges for the winged fauna.

== History ==
Formerly, the port of Cap-à-l'Aigle has contributed greatly to the local economy for the transportation of passengers, goods, fishing and boating activities. The harbor and the marina are a deep symbol of Cap-à-l'Aigle's maritime past.

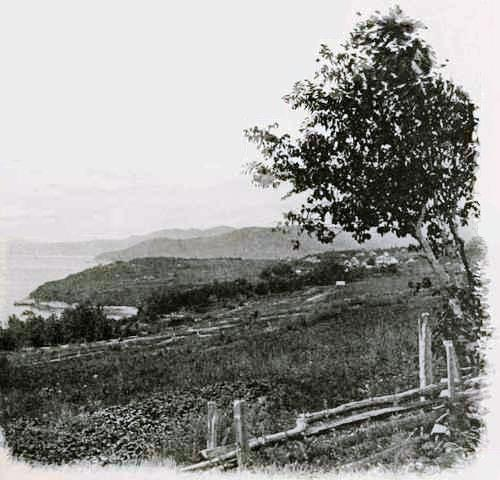
Cap-à-l'Aigle, at the end of the XIXe century

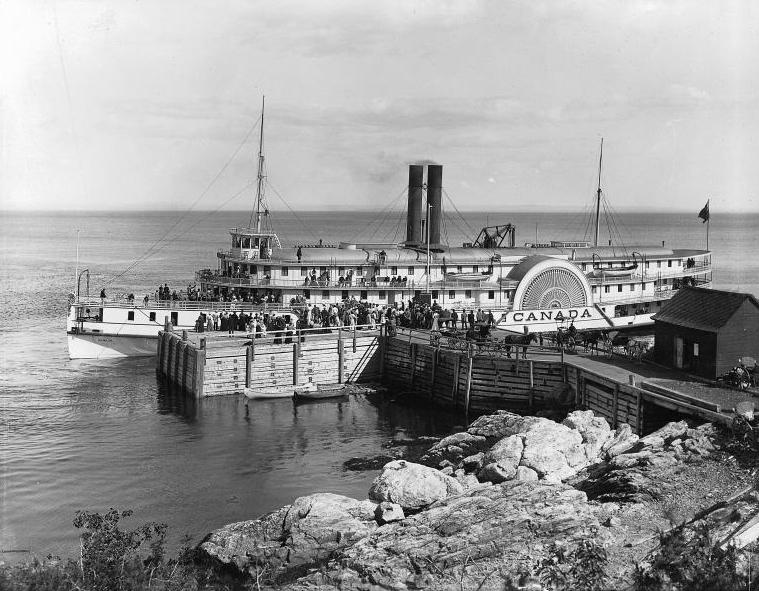
S.S. Canada, Cap-à-l'Aigle, circa 1895

== See also ==
- La Malbaie
- Malbaie River
- Charlevoix-Est
- List of former municipalities in Quebec
- Saint-Fidèle, sector of La Malbaie
- Saguenay–St. Lawrence Marine Park
