= Île aux Lièvres (St. Lawrence River) =

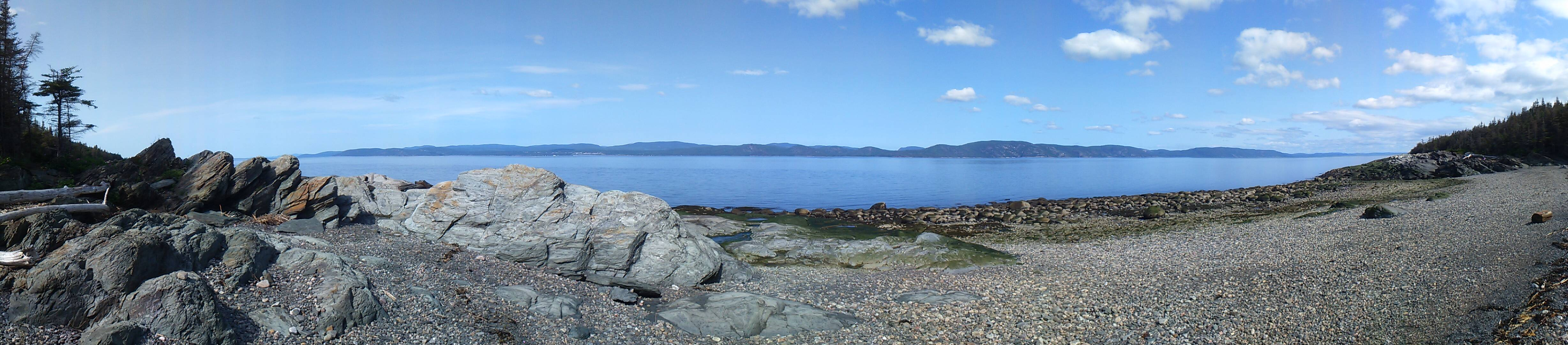
- Beach of Pointe aux Cayes, Île-aux-Lièvres

- Location within Quebec

Geography
- Location: St. Lawrence River
- Coordinates: 47.847222°N 69.73444°W
- Length: 6.9 km (4.29 mi)
- Width: 0.8 km (0.5 mi)

Administration
- Canada
- Province: Quebec
- Region: Bas-Saint-Laurent
- RCM: Kamouraska
- Municipality: Saint-Siméon

L’Île aux Lièvres (French pronunciation: [il o ljɛvʁ], English: Hare Island) is an island of the St. Lawrence River, located between Saint-Siméon and Rivière-du-Loup, near the islands of the Pot à l'Eau-de-Vie. This island is part of the municipality of Saint-André-de-Kamouraska, in the Kamouraska Regional County Municipality, in the administrative region of Bas-Saint-Laurent, in the province of Quebec, in Canada.

The island has a walking path. The ferry route between Saint-Siméon and Rivière-du-Loup passes on the south side of Île aux Lièvres.

== Geography ==
This uninhabited island is the largest in the Saguenay–St. Lawrence Marine Park. It has a length of 6.9 kilometres (4.3 mi) and a maximum width of 0.8 kilometres (0.50 mi) in its northern part. It is surrounded by a few small islands upstream and downstream. The northern channel separates Île aux Lièvres from the Charlevoix coast; the distance between this island and the cape of Tête au Chien, in Saint-Siméon, is 7.7 kilometres (4.8 mi). The Chenal du Sud separates Île aux Lièvres from the coast of Bas-Saint-Laurent; the distance between this island and the Pointe du Parc-de-l'Amitié in the parish of Saint-François-Xavier in Rivière-du-Loup, is 11.1 kilometres (6.9 mi). The "Passe de l'Île aux Lièvres" is used for navigation between the southern tip (designated "Le Petit Havre") of Île aux Lièvres and Île aux Fraises (located to the south). Three small islands located in Le Chenal du Pot à l'Eau-de-Vie, east of Anse à Warden in the northern part of Île aux Lièvres, are identified: Le Gros Pot, Le Pot du Phare and Le Petit Pot.

The eastern shore of Île aux Lièvres includes Anse des Bergeron and Petit havre à Souverain (southern part), Les Cayes (sandbank), Anse de la Souche, Anse des Rioux and Anse Double (central part), as well as Anse à Warden and l'Anse à Bonhomme-Bouchard (north part). The western shore of Île aux Lièvres includes Anse de Sable (northern part), Anse du Noyé and Anse à Arthur-Jean (central part) and Roche Blanche (southern part). The northern part of the island is designated "Le Bout d'en Bas".

Almost the entire island is surrounded by sandstone at low tide. The flats of the White Island are located to the north of the island.

== Geology, fauna and flora ==
The rocky base of Île aux Lièvres is made up of clay shales containing beds of conglomerate, Limestone, Orthoquartzite and feldspathic Sandstone. These shales are covered with a thin layer of loose deposits of coastal origin. The soils are thin and rock outcrops are abundant. The maximum altitude of the territory is 86 meters.

The majority of Île aux Lièvres is covered by white birch, except in the highest areas. The island's forest cover was affected by a fire in 1922, by intensive logging in the early 1950s and by several epidemics of spruce budworm between 1975 and 1985. The island's shrub flora is relatively poor due to the abundance of Snowshoe hare and the browsing of woody species that make up this stratum, which is dominated by balsam fir, white birch, trembling aspen, dogwood, edible viburnum and Canada yew.

Of the fifty species of forest birds inhabiting the island, the most abundant are the Swainson's thrush, the White-throated sparrow, the Bay-breasted warbler, and American robin. Several species of diurnal or nocturnal raptors have been observed there, including: the Great horned owl, the Barred owl, the Osprey, and the Northern Harrier. The Ruffed grouse, introduced in 1990 and 1991, is now omnipresent. Except for the occasional presence of the Red fox, the snowshoe hare, the Muskrat, and the Deer Mouse are the only land mammals on the island. We also observe the presence of the Brown rat.

== Duvetnor Company ==
7% of the island is owned by the Société Duvetnor, a non-profit organization dedicated to the protection of wildlife and their habitat in the islands of the middle estuary of the St. Lawrence. This NPO offers, among other destinations, ecotourism activities on Île aux Lièvres including hiking, bird and nature observation as well as stays in wilderness camping, inn or cottages. Duvetnor also collects down from the eider, a sea duck that nests on certain islands in the estuary. Also, we find among other species on the islands that the Company owns and / or manages, an abundant colony of seals and birds of the Alcidae family such as the common murre and the common guillemot mirror. The Société Duvetnor owned 100% of Île aux Lièvres for more than 30 years until 93% of it was purchased by the Quebec government in 2013.

== Protection of the territory and conservation interest ==
Following the acquisition of 93% of Île aux Lièvres in December 2012, the Ministry of Sustainable Development, Environment, Wildlife and Parks in August 2013 creation of the proposed Île-aux-Lièvres biodiversity reserve, pursuant to the Conservation of natural heritage.

Lièvres Island is part of about twenty islands between Kamouraska and the confluence of the Saguenay and the St. Lawrence. These islands and the marine space between them are of major importance to waterfowl and marine life. These islands are the property of several partners, namely, the Canadian Wildlife Service, the Nature Conservancy of Canada, the Duvetnor Society and now, the MDDEFP. Note that the latter has the central element of this conservation area, the Hare Island which also happens to be the largest of all the islands. The location and size of this island make it the cornerstone of the conservation of the St. Lawrence estuary's wildlife. Any development or major event that goes against the conservation of this island would seriously jeopardize the survival of all bird colonies and the integrity of the satellite islands.

Note in particular that the flats on Île aux Lièvres are very popular with the fauna of the estuary. They are, among other things, an important breeding site to help common eel in addition to being a site widely used by gray and harbor seals and a notable spawning site for herring.

== Toponymy ==
Its name, very stable over the centuries, dates back to May 16, 1536. Jacques Cartier indeed approaches there that day, finds "large number of hares" on which his men feed and, for this reason, names it "isle es Liepvres".

The toponym "Île aux Lièvres" was formalized on December 5, 1988 at the Place Names Bank of the Commission de toponymie du Québec.

== Gallery ==
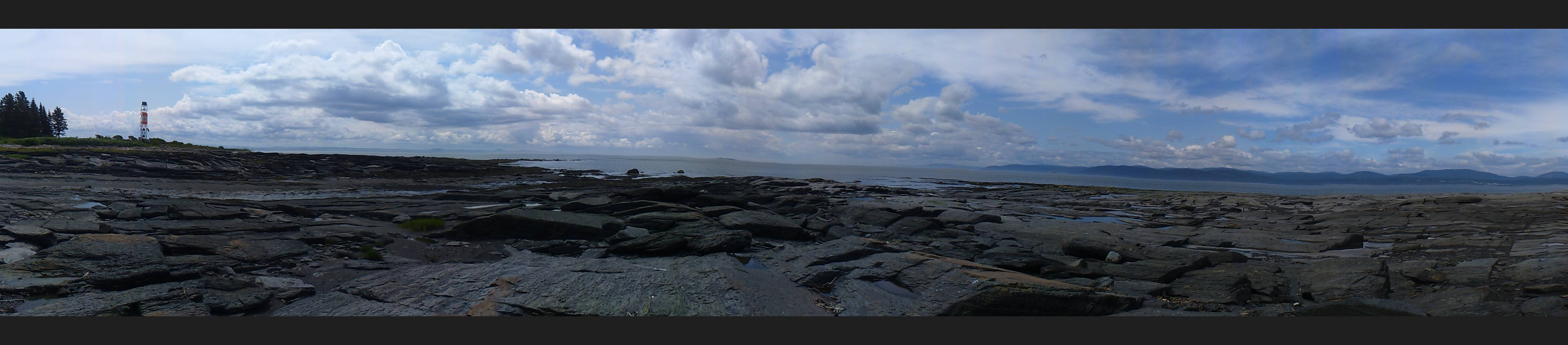
Panoramic view, Pointe Ouest, Île-aux-Lièvres

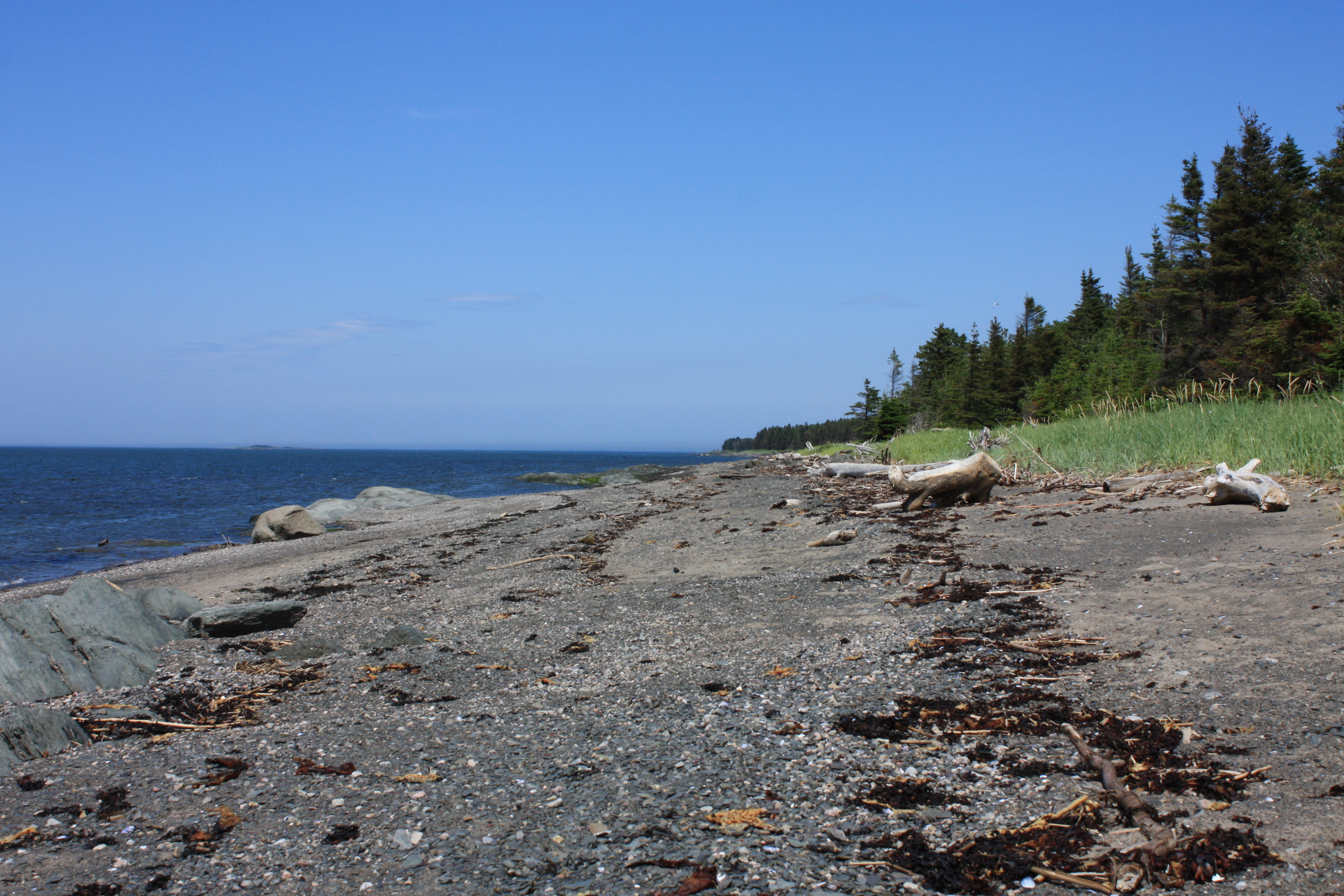
Pointe est, Anse de Sable, Île-aux-Lièvres

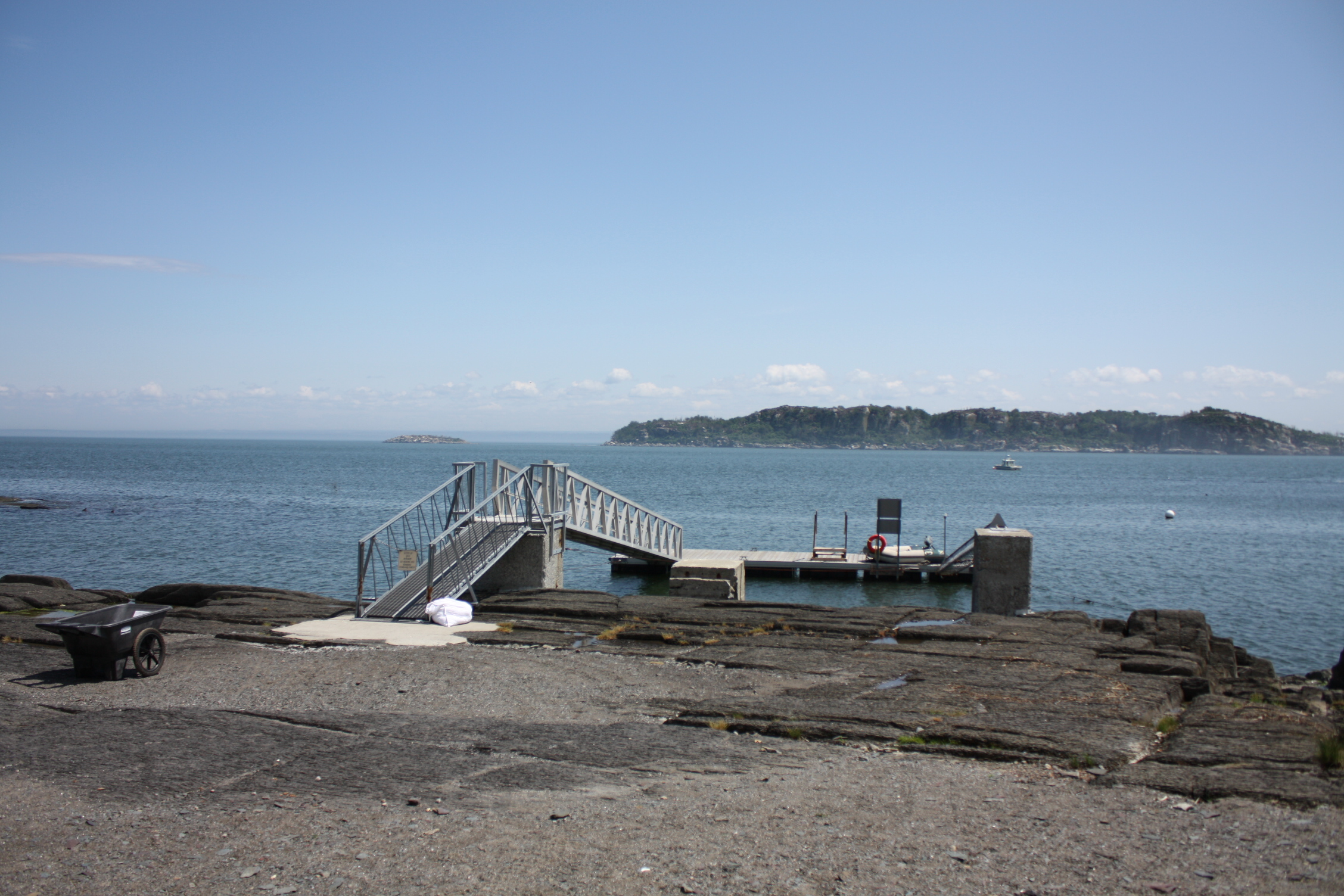
Dock of Anse à Bonhomme-Bouchard, Île-aux-Lièvres

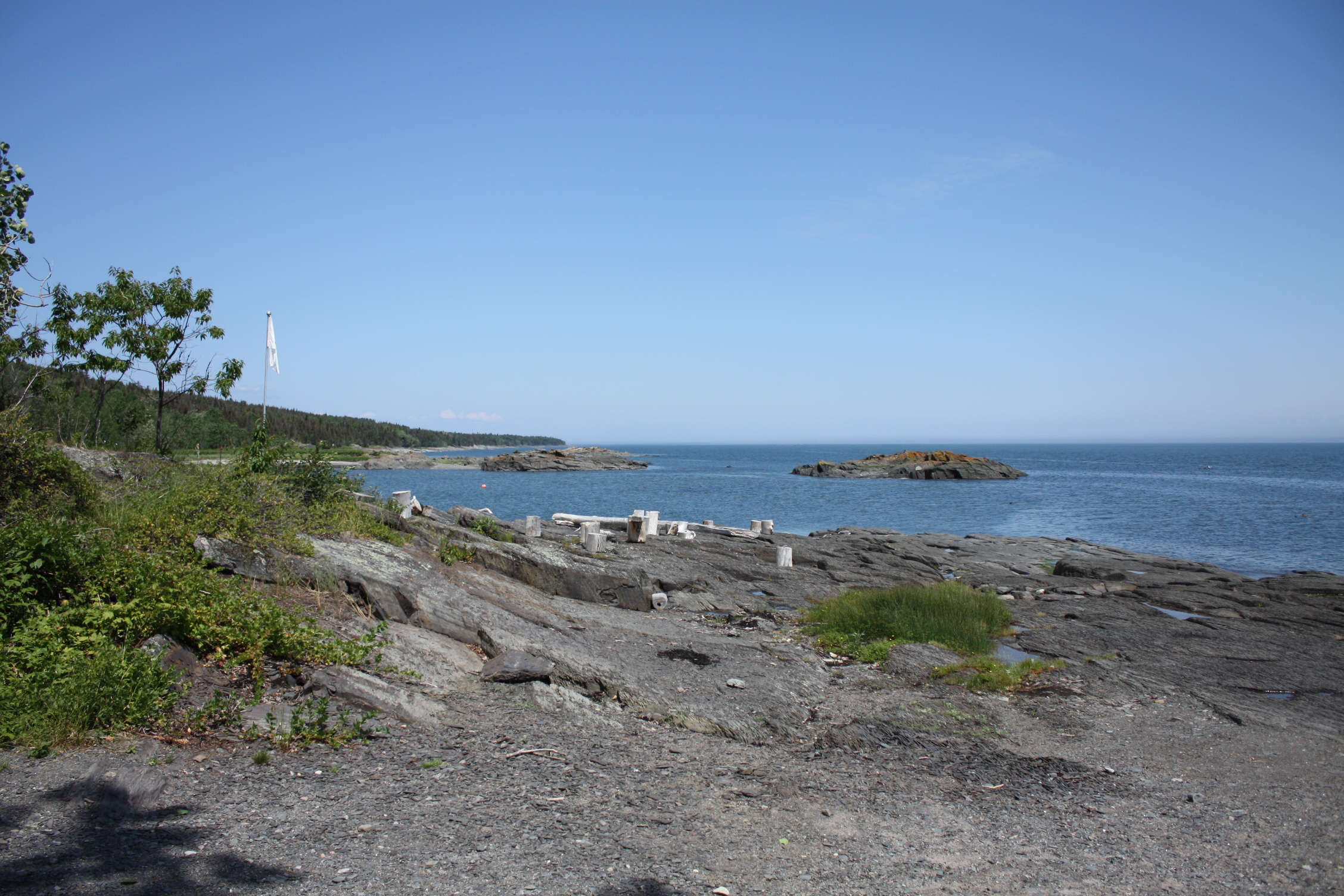
Anse à Bonhomme-Bouchard, Île-aux-Lièvres

== See also ==
- List of rivers of Quebec
