= Rivière Noire du Milieu =

Rivière Noire du Milieu (Noire River of the Middle)
- Location within Quebec

Location
- Country: Canada
- Province: Quebec
- Region: Capitale-Nationale
- Regional County Municipality: Charlevoix-Est Regional County Municipality
- Unorganized territory: Mont-Élie

Physical characteristics
- Source: Lac au Plongeon (Plongeon Lake)
  - location: Mont-Élie (zec des Martres)
  - coordinates: 47.86373°N 70.13891°W
  - elevation: 429 m (1,407 ft)
- Mouth: Noire River
  - location: Mont-Élie
  - coordinates: 47.91333°N 70.0775°W
  - elevation: 210 m (690 ft)
- Length: 9.9 km (6.2 mi)
- Discharge
  - location: Mont-Élie

Basin features
- Tributaries
  - left: Ruisseau Brosseau (via Bataram bay).
  - right: Discharge of Sabrina Lake.

The rivière Noire du Milieu (Black River of the Middle) is a tributary of the south shore of the Noire River, flowing entirely into the unorganized territory of Mont-Élie, Quebec, in the Charlevoix-Est Regional County Municipality, in Capitale-Nationale, in Quebec, Canada. The upper part is in the zec des Martres, around Plongeon Lake.

The lower part of this valley is served by route 170 which links Saint-Siméon to Petit-Saguenay, which passes on the north shore of the Noire River. This valley has some secondary forest roads for forestry and recreational tourism purposes.

Forestry is the first economic activity in the sector; recreational tourism activities, second.

The surface of the Black River Middle is usually frozen from early December to late March, however, safe ice movement is generally from mid-December to mid-March.

== Geography ==
The main hydrographic slopes near the Black River are:

- North side: Noire River, Saguenay River;
- East side: rivière Noire Sud-Ouest, Noire River, St. Lawrence River;
- South side: rivière Noire Sud-Ouest, Snigole River, Malbaie River, Jacob River, Quebec;
- West side: Petit Saguenay River.

The "rivière Noire du Milieu" originates at the mouth of Lake Plongeon (length: 3.2 km (2.0 mi), altitude: 429 m (1,407 ft)). This source is located at:

- 7.3 km (4.5 mi) south of its mouth (confluence with the Noire River);
- 20.0 km (12.4 mi) southwest of the mouth of the Noire River with the Gulf of St. Lawrence;
- 8.2 km (5.1 mi) north-east of the head lake of the Petit Saguenay River;
- 10.4 km (6.5 mi) northwest of the hamlet Mont-Grand-Fonds.

From its source (Plongeon Lake), the course of the "rivière Noire du Milieu" descends on 9.9 km (6.2 mi) according to the following segments:

- 0.9 km (0.56 mi) northerly following the outlet of Lac au Plongeon to Bataram Bay, which is attached to Lac aux Îlots;
- 3.3 km (2.1 mi) crossing Lac aux Îlots (length: 3.2 km (2.0 mi); altitude: 404 m (1,325 ft)) and bypassing a peninsula attached to the west bank to its mouth;
- 1.6 km (0.99 mi) first westward across a body of water over most of this segment (elbow-shaped, where the current is heading north) to its mouth;
- 0.7 km (0.43 mi) north, crossing a body of water (length: 0.7 km (0.43 mi); altitude: 399 km (248 mi)) on its full length formed by the widening of the river, to its mouth;
- 2.3 km (1.4 mi) northeasterly across a series of rapids to the outlet of Bataram Lake (from the west);
- 1.1 km (0.68 mi) to the northeast, crossing rapids and waterfalls, to its mouth.

The mouth of the Middle Black River empties onto the south bank of the Black River in Mont-Élie. This confluence is located at:

- 16.6 km (10.3 mi) east of the mouth of the Noire River with the Gulf of St. Lawrence;
- 30.9 km (19.2 mi) south of the course of the Saguenay River;
- 15.7 km (9.8 mi) north of the hamlet Mont-Grand-Fonds.

== Toponymy ==
The origin of the name "rivière Noire du Milieu" is derived from the name of the Noire River in which it flows.

The name "rivière Noire du Milieu" was formalized on November 26, 2002, at the Bank of place names of the Commission de toponymie du Quebec.

== See also ==
- Mont-Élie, an unorganized territory
- Zec des Martres, a controlled harvesting zone
- St. Lawrence River
- Noire River (Charlevoix), a watercourse
- List of rivers of Quebec
