= Saint-Fidèle =

Saint-Fidèle de Charlevoix
- Districts (French: quartiers)
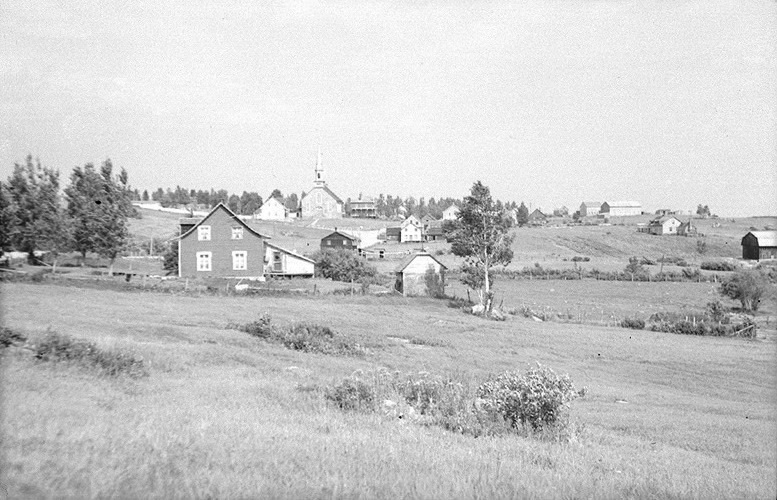
- Village of Saint-Fidèle, 1942
- Interactive map of Saint-Fidèle de Charlevoix
- Coordinates: 47°44′16″N 69°59′42″W
- Country: Canada
- Province: Quebec
- City: La Malbaie
- District of Saint-Fidèle borough: 1 December 1999
- Elevation: 257 m (843 ft)
- Time zone: UTC-5 (EST)
  - Summer (DST): UTC-4 (EDT)

The municipality of Saint-Fidèle (French pronunciation: [sɛ̃ fidɛl]) of Charlevoix, formerly the Parish Municipality of Saint-Fidèle-de-Mont-Murray, located at approximately 10.6 kilometers east of the town of La Malbaie, was merged with the latter on 1 January 2000.

== History ==
The parish of Saint-Fidèle was erected on the canonical plan on June 10, 1850, its first resident priest was granted to the population on September 17, 1855, and the municipality of Saint-Fidèle-de Mount Murray was erected on the civil plan on July 1, 1855. The first settler to settle there in 1834 was Louis Dallaire. The first chapel of Saint-Fidèle was blessed by the parish priest Augustin Beaudry of La Malbaie, in 1853. It was enlarged in 1856, but it quickly became too small. Louis Dallaire decided to give his land to build the village church. The beginning of the construction was in 1872 to be finalized in 1883. The municipality of Saint-Fidèle neighboured the villages of Cap-à-l'Aigle, Black River (Saint-Siméon) and Rivière-aux- Ducks (Baie Sainte-Catherine) which formed municipalities afterwards.

The term Saint-Fidèle refers to Fidèle de Sigmaringen.

=== The economy of Saint-Fidèle from the beginning of colonization in the late 1920s ===
The first concern of the settlers who settled at Saint-Fidèle was that of satisfying their needs; they did it with the help of agriculture. As in most farms in Charlevoix, the sowing of wheat far exceeded that of oats. The ever-increasing harvest of this cereal prompted some people to open flour mills to accommodate those who were suitable for this crop. To supplement the products necessary for their subsistence, they practiced the breeding of the domestic animals and took care of the cutting of wood. That is why, at the beginning of the year 1851, there existed in the parish two flour mills, one for carding and two others for sawing the wood.

By 1855, the exploitation of wood was almost as important as agriculture, because it had become insufficient for the colonists; while the interior of the country changed into clearings, the establishments multiplied rapidly, for during that year the parish possessed five sawmills; two in Port-au-Persil, owned by Louis Tremblay and William Price (merchant), two in Port-au-Saumon owned by Joseph Dallaire and Hypolite Truchon and a last was built at the Black River by Thomas Simard. There was also a forge where the workers made it easier for the settlers to transform the iron.
Despite the benefits of forest development, wheat was still being milled in the municipality. Lord Malcolm Fraser owned a flour mill in Port-au-Saumon and another in Port-au-Persil.

The population could also count on two general merchants: Mr. Alexis Gagnon at Port-au-Saumon and Baptiste Tremblay at Black River. At the time, all trade was by boat docking the dock of Port-au-Saumon for unloading goods. These goods were stored in sheds. In the early 1900s, it was possible to load the timber on board schooners in a small bay of Bas-de-Anse.

At the end of the 19th century, agriculture still held first place in Saint-Fidèle; wheat, potatoes, barley, oats, buckwheat, peas, alfalfa, rye and flax were sown. The latter was of great use because it was used to make clothes or any other fabric. But around 1913, agriculture gave its primary role to the timber industry. In February of the same year, Lord Georges Bonner sold to David Henry approximately 26,000 acres in the ranks of St. Margaret, Mary Grace, St. George, as well as in the fifth and sixth ranks (also called Grand-Fonds).

Immediately the company Pennington and Gagnon made undertake on the river Port-au-Saumon the construction of a dam in order to imprison the wood. Shortly after, this same dam gave way to let slip between fifteen and twenty thousand cords of wood. This raw product lost accounted for more than half of the annual production. This company was struggling with a considerable deficit could no longer meet its obligations. This tragic event is probably responsible for the arrival of a new timber company at Saint-Fidèle; Mount Murray Woodland Corporation headquartered in New York.

In the early 1900s this business paid the woodcutter a dollar to a dollar fifty per cord of wood for six days of hard work.

Since the time that companies traded timber, the number of public establishments increased. In 1924, there were three general stores, a butter factory, three cheese factories, three sawmills, three iron shops and two butcher shops, the most famous of which was that of Germain Gagnon, resident of Rang Saint-Paul, who, in order to give more service to his clientele sold his goods from door to door.

In 1925, for whatever reason, the Mount Murray Woodland Corporation was replaced by the International Paper company whose contactors were Arthène Bélanger and Frères.

== La Cremerie St-Fidèle (The St-Fidèle dairy) ==
In 1902, a cheese factory was added to the public establishments of Saint-Fidèle. In order to be able to build it, the owner, Mr. Wilfrid Bhérer, had bought a piece of land from Gracieuse Bhérer. This land was located at the entrance of rang Saint-Paul.

In 1905, Mr. Joseph Bhérer took possession of the cheese factory. From May to November, this man, without the help of anyone, took care of running his business. In those days, the method of cheese making required more manual work, and the possibilities of preserving this dairy product in cold rooms much less sophisticated than those of today entailed a certain risk. In 1922 Mr. Bhérer built a new factory in which he could also make butter until 1929. In order to improve the conditions of manufacture, he had to develop in Saint-Fidèle a creamery equipped with modern equipment. From this year, its production became financially profitable. In 1933, Mr. Joseph Bhérer dies and it is his daughter, Blanche Bhérer, married to Joseph Tremblay, who becomes the owner of the company.

From 1929 to 1945, we did not use production techniques as developed as today, but it still met the needs of the time. There was no electricity, so the butter churn worked from a steam engine. In the winter, ice was cut on the lakes and used to cool the cream during the summer season. The company's products were distributed in the vicinity of Saint-Fidèle. In summer, trucks were used, while in winter, horses were returned, and a little later, snow mobiles were used.

A new technology appeared in 1946, the electrification of the village. This is the year that the pasteurization of cream began.

In 1962, the Tremblay bought the Fromagerie Savard of Baie-Sainte-Catherine and this is the beginning of the construction of the current modern plant to combine the operations of manufacturing butter and cheese. The new plant will begin operations in July 1963.

In 1967, the personal business became a limited liability company on the initiative of co-owners Lucien and Clément Tremblay who are the sons of Joseph Tremblay. In 1968, La Crémerie St-Fidèle bought the manufacturing permit for the Éboulements cooperative, and in 1969, the bulk of milk was collected. In the first year, there were only five producers who had coolers.

We have to wait until 1976 to see the beginning of the production of cheese emmental called Switzerland. With this new production, the plant was becoming much too small. That's why the Tremblay brothers decided in 1977 to proceed with a new expansion. Since then, Crèmerie Saint-Fidèle has won a first prize for the production of its Emmental cheese at a national exhibition in Toronto. This mention was to dedicate the quality of production in this type of cheese.

In 1988, brothers Lucien and Clément Tremblay decided to sell their business to the Coopérative Agricole de la Côte Sud. This Coop is joined with other cooperatives that formed the Lactel Group

In 2000, the Lactel Group closed the Crémerie Saint-Fidèle.

It was not until May 2001 that a consortium reopened the dairy.

The owners are therefore:

- Bay Dairy Inc.
- Fromagerie Boivin Inc.
- Milk Alliance (group of 36 dairy producers in Saguenay Lac St-Jean, Charlevoix)

== List of priests of the parish (1855 - 2007) ==
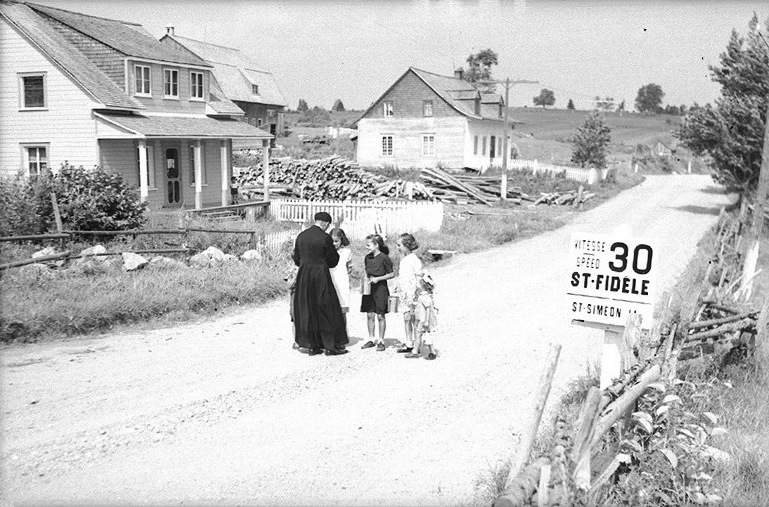
The priest talking to children, 1942

Abbot	Dates
Abbot Fidèle Morisset	1855 - 1859
Father Georges-Stanislas Beaulieu	1859 - 1867
Abbot Charles-Godefroi Gaudin	1867 - 1869
Abbot Louis-Napoleon Cinq-Mars	1869 - 1875
Abbot Edmond-Wilbrod Tremblay	1875 - 1889
Father Amédée-Narcisse Parent	1889 - 1904
Rev. Ovide Larouche	1904 - 1920
Abbé Aimé Laberge	1920 - 1941
Father Thomas-Louis Imbeault	1941 - 1949
Father Louis-Nil Tremblay	1949 - 1963
Father Bertrand Fournier	1963 - 1965
Abbot C. Painchaud	1965 - 1969
Father G. Tremblay	1969 - 1970
Father Lucien Harvey	1970 - 1977
Father Georges Gravel	1977 - 1981
Father François Germain	1981 - 1985
Father Yvon Drolet	1985 - 1987
Father Jacques Michaud	1987 - 1993
Father Rosary Leblanc	1993 - 2001
Benoît Tessier	2001 - 2007

== List of mayors of the Parish Municipality of Saint-Fidèle de Charlevoix ==
John McLaren	1855 - 1858
Paul Mailloux	1858 - 1859, 1868 - 1873, 1880 - 1883
Ephrem Bouchard	1859 - 1859
Jean Brisson	1859 - 1859
Alexis Gagnon	1859 - 1862, 1879 - 1880, 1883 - 1886
Maxfield McLaren	1862 - 1863
Édouard Tremblay	1863 - 1864
Michel Tremblay	1864 - 1868
Denis Gauthier	1873 - 1879
Antoine Perron	1886 - 1888, 1890 - 1891
François Dallaire	1888 - 1890, 1891 - 1893, 1895 - 1900, 1901 - 1902
Jean-Baptiste Bouchard	1893 - 1895
François Tremblay	1900 - 1901, 1902 - 1904
Ulysse Bouchard	1901 - 1901
Xavier Tremblay	1904 - 1921
Ernest Bouchard	1921 - 1923, 1925 - 1927
Wilbrod Bhérer	1923 - 1925, 1931 - 1933
Thomas Savard	1927 - 1931
Ulysse Villeneuve	1933 - 1935
Kelley Harvey	1935 - 1941
Napoleon Boies	1941 - 1945, 1947 - 1949
Alcide Tremblay	1945 - 1947
Orias Square	1949 - 1955
Jean-Charles Ratté	1955 - 1963
Wilbrod Dufour	1963 - 1965
Vincent Lavoie	1965 - 1979, 1985 - 1989
Clément Tremblay	1979 - 1985
J. Edgar Rochette	1989 - 1993
Marguerite Dufour	1993 - 1997
Ulysse Duchesne	1997 - 1999

== Notes and references ==
=== Sources ===
- Fromagerie Saint-Fidèle
