= Noire River (Charlevoix) =

Rivière Noire
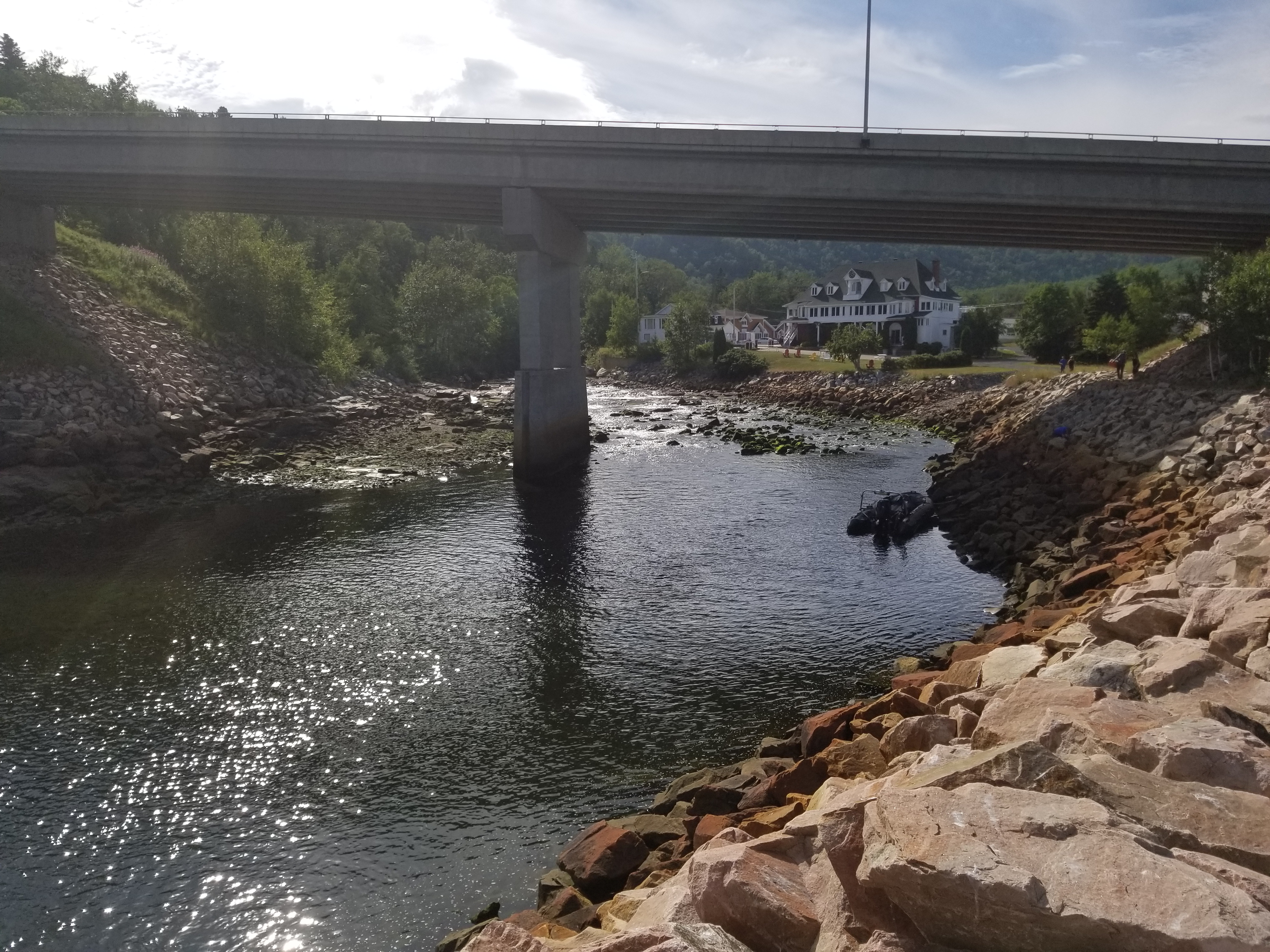
- Bridge of route 138 passing over Noire River in Saint-Siméon.

- Location within Quebec

Location
- Country: Canada
- Province: Quebec
- Region: Capitale-Nationale
- Regional County Municipality: Charlevoix-Est Regional County Municipality
- City: Saint-Siméon

Physical characteristics
- Source: Lac à l'Ours (Bear Lake)
  - location: Saint-Siméon
  - coordinates: 47.960535°N 70.23307°W
  - elevation: 549 m (1,801 ft)
- Mouth: St. Lawrence River
  - location: Saint-Siméon
  - coordinates: 47.8475°N 69.87527°W
  - elevation: 3 m (9.8 ft)
- Length: 30 km (19 mi)
- Discharge
  - location: Saint-Siméon

Basin features
- Tributaries
  - left: (from the mouth) Décharge du lac à Jean, décharge du lac Germain, décharge des lacs du Castor, Louis, Michel, Paul et Petit lac Noir, décharge des lacs Chaud, Petit lac de la Montagne, Petit lac Chaud, ruisseau Étienne.
  - right: (from the mouth) Décharge du lac Élisabeth, décharge du lac André, rivière Noire Sud-Ouest, rivière Noire du Milieu (rivière Noire), décharge du lac H et du Deuxième lac des Sept, décharge du lac des Petits Garçons, décharge du lac aux Écureuil, décharge du lac du Sauvage, décharge du lac du Tétras.

The Noire River is a tributary of the North-West shore of Saint Lawrence River flowing north-east of La Malbaie, in the municipality of Saint-Siméon, in Charlevoix-Est Regional County Municipality, in Quebec, in Canada.

The lower portion of this valley is served by Route 138 which runs along the shoreline of the St. Lawrence River. Route 170 which links Saint-Siméon to Petit-Saguenay village serves the lower and middle parts of this valley. The upper part of the valley has some secondary forest roads for forestry and recreation purposes.

Forestry is the first economic activity in the sector; recreational tourism activities, second.

The surface of the Black River is usually frozen from early December to late March, however, safe ice movement is generally from mid-December to mid-March.

== Geography ==
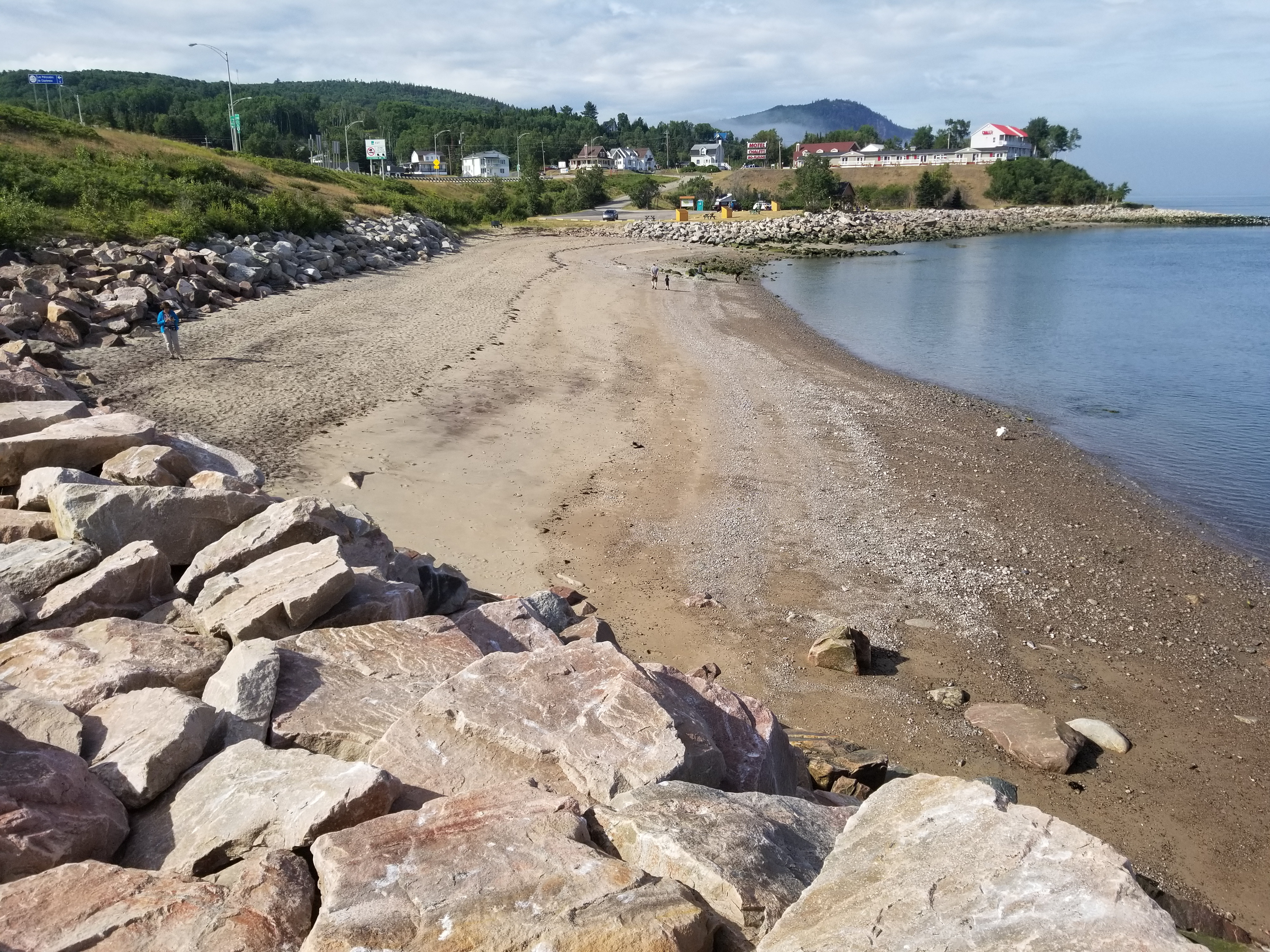
View of the bay from the stone embankment at the mouth of the Noire River, on the side North of the village of Saint-Siméon.

The main hydrographic slopes near the Noire River are:

- North side: Petite rivière Saguenay, Laurent Creek, Deschênes River, Rivière de la Baie des Rochers, Saguenay River;
- East side: St. Lawrence River;
- South side: Noire South West River, Port au Persil River, Port au Saumon River, Rivière à la Loutre, Comporté River, Malbaie River, Jacob River;
- West side: Petit Saguenay River, Catin River, Pin Creek, Cami River.

The Noire River rises at the mouth of "lac à l'Ours" (Bear Lake) (length: 0.5 km (0.31 mi), altitude: 549 km (341 mi)). This spring is located at 29.7 km (18.5 mi) west of the mouth of the Noire River (confluence with the St. Lawrence River, 31.2 km (19.4 mi) south of Anse St. John of the Saguenay River, 43.4 km (27.0 mi) south-west of the mouth of the Saguenay River and 37.7 km (23.4 mi) northwest of downtown La Malbaie.

From its source (lac à l'Ours), the course of the Noire River descends on 43.9 km (27.3 mi) according to the following segments:

Upper course of the Noire River (segment: 18.3 km (11.4 mi))

- 1.1 km (0.68 mi) south-east, crossing the "lac de la Branche" (Branche Lake) and the "lac de l'Épinette" (Épinette Lake) (length: 0.8 km (0.50 mi); altitude: 547 m (1,795 ft)) on 0.7 km (0.43 mi) to its mouth;
- 1.8 km (1.1 mi) to the south forming a large S, up to a river bend;
- 6.3 km (3.9 mi) north-east, then branching south-east at the end of the segment, to a creek (coming from the west);
- 3.3 km (2.1 mi) east to the west shore of the "lac de la rivière Noire" (Noire River Lake);
- 2.2 km (1.4 mi) East, then West across Noire River Lake (length: 2.2 m (7.2 ft); altitude: 283 m (928 ft)), to its mouth;
- 3.6 km (2.2 mi) north-east, then south-east, crossing two large rapids, one at the end of the segment, to the Black River Middle (coming from the Southwest);

Lower course of the Noire River (segment: 25.6 km (15.9 mi))

- 3.2 km (2.0 mi) to the east by collecting the dump (coming from the North) of Lake Germain and forming a hook to the South, to the Black River Southwest (coming from South);
- 1.4 km (0.87 mi) to the east, until the discharge (coming from the North) of lakes including Hay Lake, Lake Brouillard and Lake Simard;
- 9.5 km (5.9 mi) northeasterly forming a few serpentines in a small walled valley, up to a river bend;
- 11.5 km (7.1 mi) to the southeast, forming some serpentines in a plain between two series of mountains, crossing the "rapids at William" and cutting at the end of the segment on Route 138 to the mouth of the river.

The mouth of the Noire River flows on the northwestern shore of the St. Lawrence River on the north side of the village of Saint-Siméon. This confluence is located at: South of the mouth of the Saguenay River;

- 30.0 km (18.6 mi) north-east of downtown La Malbaie;
- 65.9 km (40.9 mi) north-east of downtown Baie-Saint-Paul.

== Toponymy ==
The toponym "rivière Noire" was formalized on December 5, 1968 at the Bank of place names of the Commission de toponymie du Quebec.

== See also ==
- Saint-Siméon, Capitale-Nationale, Quebec, a municipality
- St. Lawrence River
- Rivière Noire Sud-Ouest, a watercourse
- Rivière Noire du Milieu, a watercourse
- List of rivers of Quebec
