= Saint-Georges-de-Champlain =

Sector of Shawinigan, Quebec

Coordinates: 46.6421°N 72.6542°W

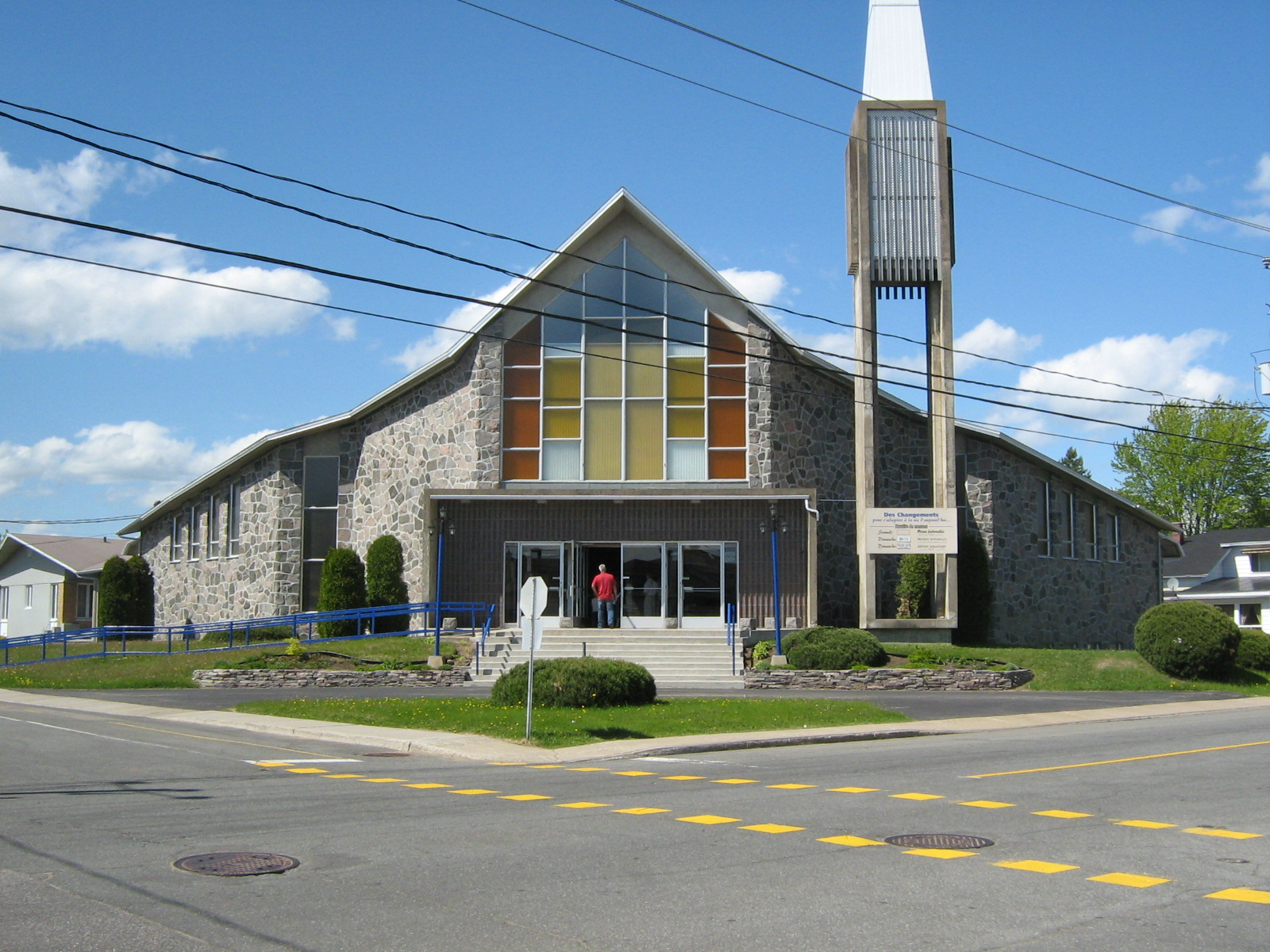
Saint-Georges church in Saint-Georges-de-Champlain

Saint-Georges (French pronunciation: [sɛ̃ ʒɔʁʒ]), often unofficially known as Saint-Georges-de-Champlain ([sɛ̃ ʒɔʁʒ də ʃɑ̃plɛ̃]), was a former village municipality and is now a sector (secteur) of the city of Shawinigan.

Until 1919, Saint-Georges had been known as Village Turcotte. It merged with Shawinigan in a municipal amalgamation on January 1, 2002. In the Canada 1996 Census its population was 3,929.

== Mayors ==
From 1916 to 2001, Saint-Georges had its own mayor and its own city council. The mayors were:

#	Mayor	Taking Office	Leaving
1	James Mongrain	1916	1917
2	Henri Parenteau	1917	1927
3	Albert Beaudoin	1927	1933
4	Wellie Béland	1933	1936
5	Edmond Thibeault	1936	1939
3	Albert Beaudoin	1939	1947
6	Albany Caron	1947	1953
7	Déus Turcotte	1953	1959
8	J.-Oscar Lemelin	1959	1960
7	Déus Turcotte	1960	1961
9	Paul-Marcel Lahaye	1961	1963
10	Gérard Lajoie	1963	1965
11	Émile Bédard	1965	1986
12	Guy Gélinas	1986	1991
13	Yves Périgny	1992	1997
14	France Beaulieu	1997	2001
