= Port au Saumon River =

Tributary of the St. Lawrence River, MRC Charlevoix-east (Quebec, Canada)

Port-au-Saumon River
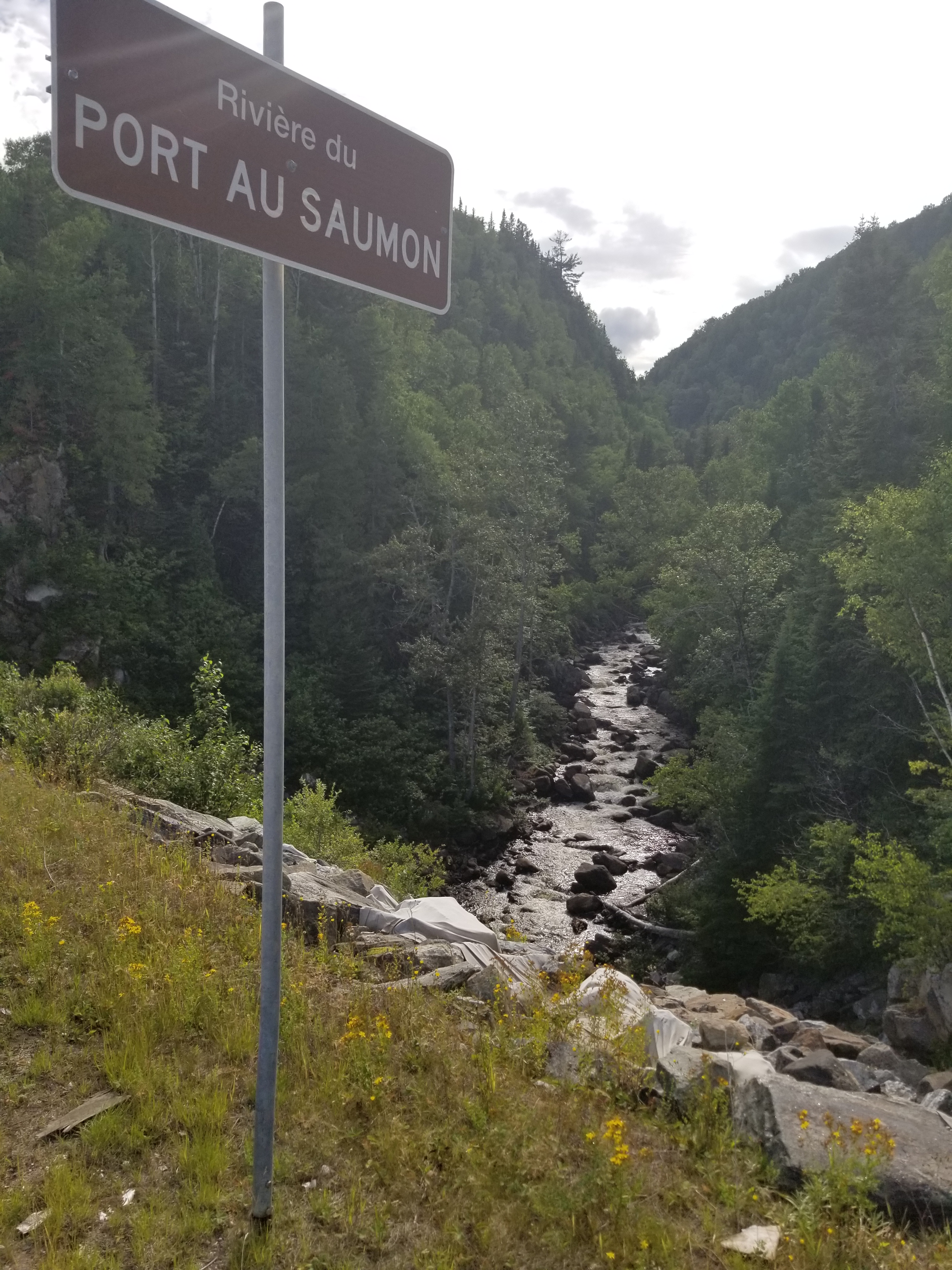
- Seen upstream of the course of the "Salmon Port River" from the Highway 138 bridge

Location
- Country: Canada
- Province: Quebec
- Region: Capitale-Nationale
- Regional County Municipality: Charlevoix Regional County Municipality
- City: La Malbaie

Physical characteristics
- Source: Port-au-Saumon Lake
  - location: La Malbaie
  - coordinates: 47.84240°N 70.01013°W
  - elevation: 288 m (945 ft)
- Mouth: St. Lawrence River
  - location: La Malbaie
  - coordinates: 47.75528°N 69.95361°W
  - elevation: 0 m (0 ft)
- Length: 20.8 km (12.9 mi)
- Discharge
  - location: La Malbaie

Basin features
- Tributaries
  - left: (from the mouth) Marguerite creek, discharge of "Port au Persil Lake".

The Port-au-Saumon River is a tributary of the northwest shore of the St. Lawrence River, flowing into the town of La Malbaie, into the Charlevoix-Est Regional County Municipality, in the Capitale-Nationale administrative region, Quebec, Canada. The course of this river flows into the St. Lawrence River in the hamlet of Port-au-Saumon, northeast of the town of La Malbaie.

The lower part of the valley of this watercourse is served by route 138 which runs along the northwest shore of the St. Lawrence River and by the road of the rang Sainte-Anne. The "chemin des érables" and Port-au-Saumon Lake Road serve the upper reaches of this stream.

Forestry is the main economic activity of the sector; recreational and tourism activities (including vacationing around Lac au Saumon), second.

The surface of this stream is generally frozen from mid-December to late-March. Nevertheless, safe ice traffic is generally from late December to mid-March.

== Geography ==
The main hydrographic slopes near the "Port-au-Saumon River" are:

- North side: Port au Persil River, Noire River (Charlevoix), Port aux Quilles River, rivière de la Baie des Rochers, Saguenay River;e
- East side: Port-au-Saumon Bay, St. Lawrence River;
- South side: Malbaie River, Comporté River, Pednaud Creek, Loutre River (Rivière du Gouffre), Mailloux River, Jean-Noël River;
- West side: rivière Noire Sud-Ouest, Jacob River, Snigole River, Malbaie River.

The Port-au-Saumon River has its source at "Lac du Port-au-Saumon" (length: 0.7 km (0.43 mi); altitude: 288 m (945 ft)) which is clover-shaped deformed and in forest area. The resort is developed around the northern appendage of the lake. The mouth of the lake is at the bottom of the eastern appendage.

From the mouth of Port-au-Saumon Lake, the course of the Port-au-Saumon River descends by traveling 20.8 km (12.9 mi) according to the following segments:

Upper part of the Port au Saumon River (segment of 15.1 km (9.4 mi))

- 4.3 km (2.7 mi) easterly along the south side of Port-au-Saumon Lake Road, then south-east, winding to the confluence of the Lake of Port au Saumon (coming from the north);
- 3.3 km (2.1 mi) southeast winding to a creek (coming from the west);
- 7.5 km (4.7 mi) south winding to a creek (coming from the west);

Lower part of the Port au Saumon River (segment of 5.7 km (3.5 mi))

- 4.9 km (3.0 mi) northeasterly under the Sainte-Anne Rang Road Bridge, forming a southerly curve across a series of rapids over this segment to the bridge of the Route 138 (Malcom-Fraser Boulevard);
- 0.8 km (0.50 mi) southeasterly crossing a series of rapids to the east shore of Port-au-Saumon Inlet which is interelected in the Gulf of St. Lawrence. Sabere and Camarine Islands guard the exit of this bay.

== Toponymy ==
The French toponym "Port-au-Saumon" is linked to the bay, the hamlet, the river and the lake.

The toponym "Port-au-Saumon River" was formalized on December 5, 1968, at the Bank of place names of the Commission de toponymie du Quebec.

== See also ==
- List of rivers of Quebec
