= Saint-Siméon, Quebec (designated place) =

Coordinates: 47.844387°N 69.877795°W

Saint-Siméon is a community in the Municipality of Saint-Siméon, Quebec, Canada. It is recognized as a designated place by Statistics Canada.

== Demographics ==
In the 2021 Census of Population conducted by Statistics Canada, Saint-Siméon had a population of 753 living in 338 of its 415 total private dwellings, a change of −8.5% from its 2016 population of 823. With a land area of 5.56 km^{2} (2.15 sq mi), it had a population density of 135.4/km^{2} (350.8/sq mi) in 2021.

Historical census populations – Saint-Siméon Village (1911–2001)

Year	Pop.	±%
1921	665	—
1931	875	+31.6%
1941	858	−1.9%
1951	1,103	+28.6%
1956	1,114	+1.0%
1961	1,197	+7.5%
1966	1,145	−4.3%

Year	Pop.	±%
1971	1,186	+3.6%
1976	1,163	−1.9%
1981	1,152	−0.9%
1986	1,074	−6.8%
1991	1,020	−5.0%
1996	1,012	−0.8%
2001	984	−2.8%

Population counts are not adjusted for boundary changes.
Source: Statistics Canada

== See also ==
- List of communities in Quebec
- List of designated places in Quebec
