= Saint-Siméon, Capitale-Nationale =

Saint-Siméon
- Municipality
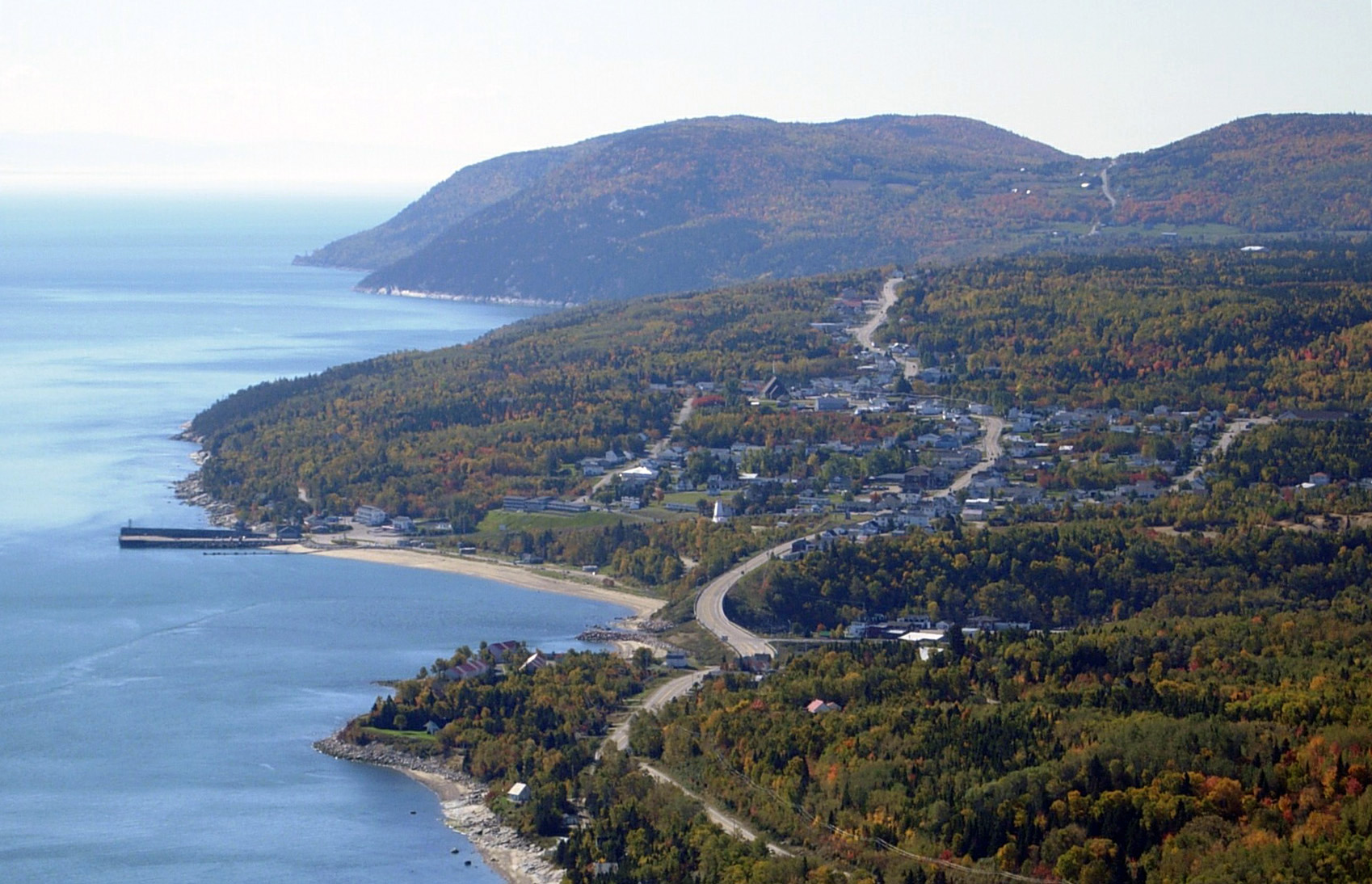
- Saint-Siméon seen from the hills

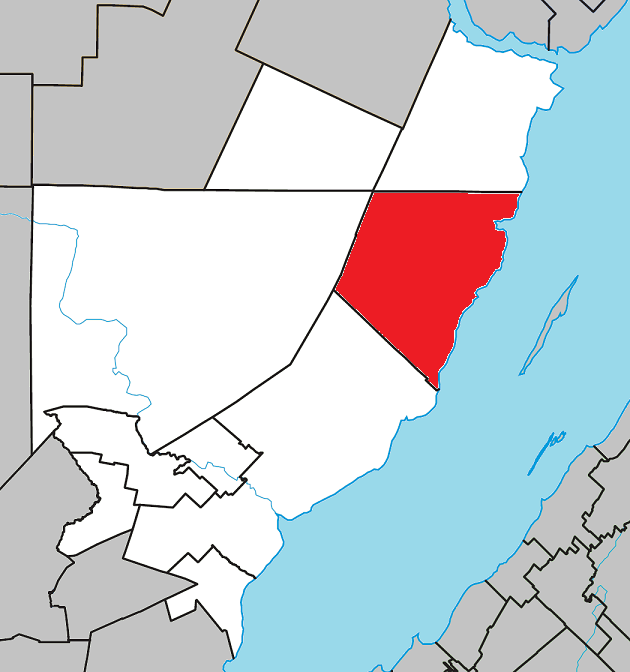
- Location within Charlevoix-Est RCM

- Location in central Quebec
- Coordinates: 47°50′N 69°53′W
- Country: Canada
- Province: Quebec
- Region: Capitale-Nationale
- RCM: Charlevoix-Est
- Constituted: April 25, 2001

Government
  - Mayor: Sylvain Tremblay
  - Federal riding: Montmorency—Charlevoix
  - Prov. riding: Charlevoix–Côte-de-Beaupré

Area
  - Total: 414.04 km^{2} (159.86 sq mi)
  - Land: 281.14 km^{2} (108.55 sq mi)

Population (2021)
  - Total: 1,139
  - Density: 4.1/km^{2} (11/sq mi)
  - Pop (2016-21): ▼7.2%
  - Dwellings: 713
- Time zone: UTC−5 (EST)
  - Summer (DST): UTC−4 (EDT)
- Postal code(s): G0T 1X0
- Area codes: 418 and 581
- Highways: R-138 R-170
- Website: www.saintsimeon.ca

Saint-Siméon (French pronunciation: [sɛ̃ simeɔ̃]) is a municipality in the Charlevoix-Est Regional County Municipality of Quebec, Canada. Founded in 1869, it was named after Saint Simeon of Jerusalem.

Its population centres include Saint-Siméon, Baie-des-Rochers, Port-au-Persil, and Port-aux-Quilles, most located along Route 138.

== History ==
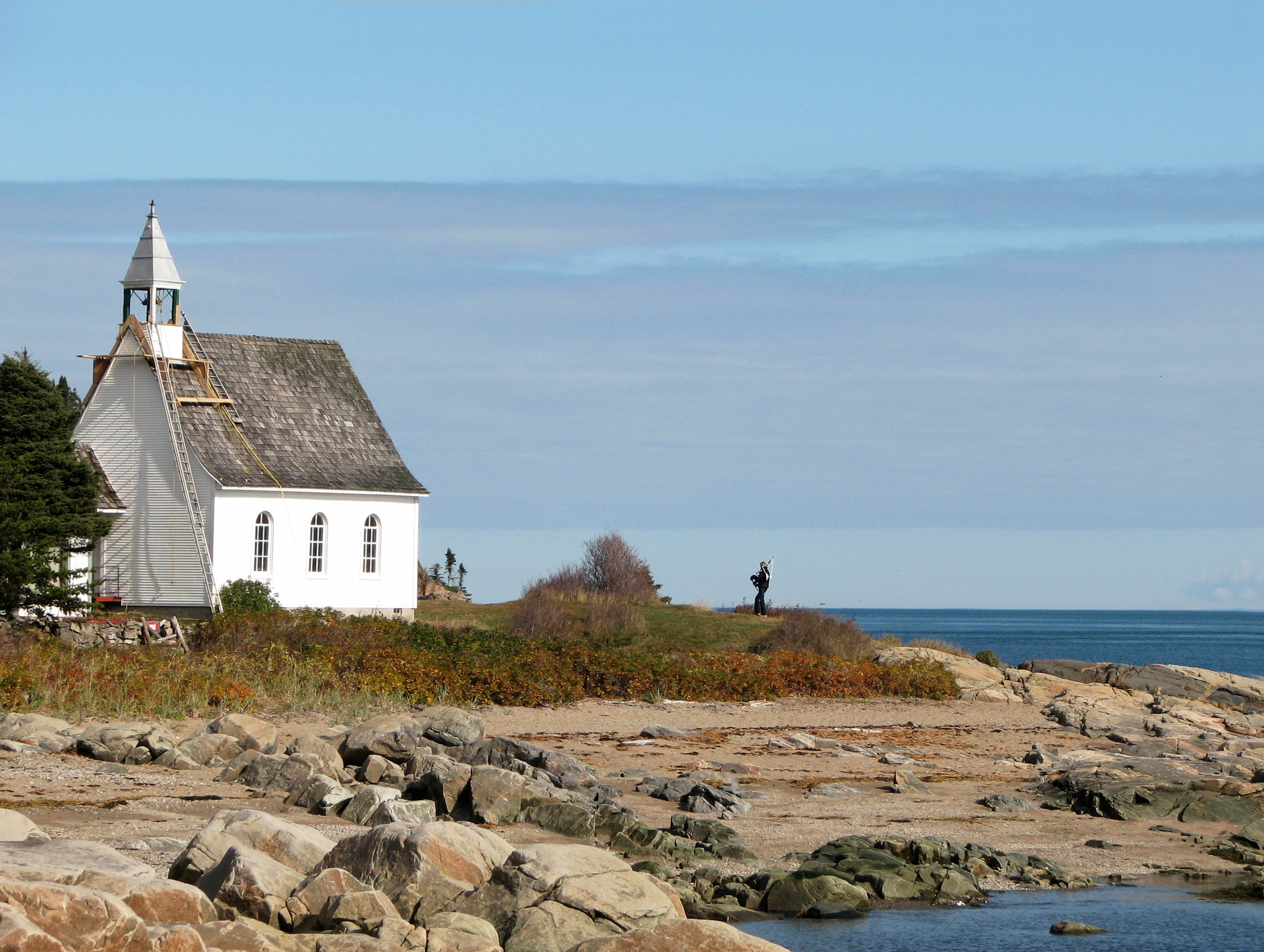
Chapel of Port-au-Persil on the St. Lawrence River. It was built in 1893 by Scottish immigrant Neil McLaren who also founded the village of Port-au-Pesil that today counts about a 100 people.

The municipality was formed as a parish municipality in 1869 when it was separated from Saint-Fidèle-de-Mont-Murray (now part of La Malbaie). Its post office opened in 1882. In 1911, the main village was separated from the parish municipality and incorporated as the Village Municipality of Saint-Siméon. In 2001, the two municipal entities were rejoined as the new Municipality of Saint-Siméon.

== Demographics ==
Canada census – Saint-Siméon community profile

	2021	2016
Population	1,139 (-7.2% from 2016)	1,227 (-5.6% from 2011)
Land area	281.14 km^{2} (108.55 sq mi)	284.14 km^{2} (109.71 sq mi)
Population density	4.1/km^{2} (11/sq mi)	4.3/km^{2} (11/sq mi)
Median age	59.2 (M: 59.6, F: 59.2)	55.3 (M: 54.9, F: 55.7)
Private dwellings	713 (total)	712 (total)
Median household income	$58,400	$55,488

References: 2021 2016

Historical census populations – Saint-Siméon
Year	Pop.	±%
2006	1,360	—
2011	1,300	−4.4%
2016	1,227	−5.6%
2021	1,139	−7.2%
Source: Statistics Canada

Private dwellings occupied by usual residents (2021): 518 (total dwellings: 713)

=== Language ===
Mother tongue (2021):

- English as first language: 2.3%
- French as first language: 96.8%
- English and French as first language: 0.5%
- Other as first language: 0.5%

== Government ==
List of former mayors since formation of current municipality:

- Pierre Asselin (2001–2009)
- Sylvain Tremblay (2009–present)

== See also ==
- List of municipalities in Quebec
